This is a list of the 907 species of butterflies of the Philippines. The Philippine archipelago is one of the world's great reservoirs of biodiversity and endemism. The archipelago includes over 7000 islands (allowing intense allopatric speciation), a total land area of 300,780 km2 and diverse ecoregions. 352 butterfly species are endemic to the Philippines. The Philippine Islands are in the Indomalayan realm.

Key: Ba=Babuyanes, Bl=Balabac, Bas=Basilan, Bat=Batanes, Bg=Bogao, Bl=Bohol, Bus=Busuanga, Bng=Bongao, Ca=Camotes, Cu=Cebu, Cn=Calamian Islands, Cy=Cuyo, Dt=Dinagat, Du=Dumaran, Gu=Guimaras, Hn=Homonhon, Jl=Jolo, Le=Leyte, Lz=Luzon, Ma=Mapun, Me=Masbate, Mi=Mindanao, Mo=Mindoro, Mq=Marinduque, N=Negros, P=Philippines, Pnn=Panaon, Pn=Palawan, Pl=Polillo, Py=Panay, Sn=Sibuyan, Sar=Sarangani, Sng=Sanga-Sanga, Sb=Sibutu, So=Siargao, Sr=Samar, Si=Siasi, Sq=Siquijor, Ta=Tablas, Twi=Tawi-Tawi, Ticao=Ticao.

Papilionidae

genus: Troides
Troides rhadamantus (Boisduval, 1836)
Troides plateni (Staudinger, 1888)
Troides magellanus magellanus (C. Felder & R. Felder, 1862)

genus: Trogonoptera

Trogonoptera trojana brookiana (Wallace, 1855)

genus: Atrophaneura

Atrophaneura semperi (C. Felder & R. Felder, 1861)
Atrophaneura semperi melanotus (Staudinger, 1889) (P, Pn, Cn)
Atrophaneura semperi albofasciata (Semper, 1892) (P, Mo)
Atrophaneura semperi supernotatus (Rothschild, 1895) (P, Bl, Cu, Le, Pnn, Sr)
Atrophaneura semperi baglantis (Rothschild, 1908) (P, N)
Atrophaneura semperi imogene Schröder & Treadaway, 1979 (P, Sn)
Atrophaneura semperi lizae Schröder & Treadaway, 1984 (P, Py)
Atrophaneura semperi sorsogona Page & Treadaway, 1996 (P, south-eastern Lz)
Atrophaneura semperi justini Page & Treadaway, 2003 (P, Me)
Atrophaneura semperi aphthonia (Rothschild, 1908) (Mi & Ins. vic)

genus: Losaria

Losaria neptunus (Guérin-Méneville, 1840)
Losaria neptunus dacasini (Schröder, 1976) (P, Pn)
Losaria neptunus matbai Schröder & Treadaway, 1990 (P, Twi)

genus: Pachliopta

Pachliopta atropos (Staudinger, 1888)
Pachliopta aristolochiae (Fabricius, 1775)
Pachliopta aristolochiae interpositus Fruhstorfer, 1904 (Bat)
Pachliopta kotzebuea (Eschscholtz, 1821)
Pachliopta kotzebuea kotzebuea (P, western and central Lz)
Pachliopta kotzebuea bilara (Page & Treadaway, 1995) (P, Bl, Cu)
Pachliopta kotzebuea deseilus (Fruhstorfer, 1911) (P, Mo, Mq, Me, Tco, Py, N, Sn Islands)
Pachliopta kotzebuea mataconga (Page & Treadaway, 1995) (P, southern Lz)
Pachliopta kotzebuea philippus (Semper, 1891) (P, Sr, Le, Dt, Mi, Pnn, Camiguin de Mi, So, Hn, Sar)
Pachliopta kotzebuea tindongana (Page & Treadaway, 1995) (P, north-eastern Lz, Ba)
Pachliopta antiphus (Fabricius)
Pachliopta antiphus acuta (Druce, 1873) (P, Jl, Ma, Twi, Sng, Sb, Bas)
Pachliopta antiphus brevicauda (Staudinger, 1889) (P, Bus, Cy, Du, Pn)
Pachliopta antiphus elioti (Page & Treadaway, 1995) (P, Si)
Pachliopta phlegon (C. Felder & R. Felder, 1864)
Pachliopta phlegon phlegon (C. Felder & R. Felder, 1864) (Mi)
Pachliopta phlegon splendida Schröder & Treadaway, 1984 (Sn)
Pachliopta phlegon strandi Bryk, 1930 (Gu, Lz, Mq, Mo, Pnn)
Pachliopta mariae (Semper, 1878) endemic
Pachliopta mariae mariae (P, Bl, Cu, Le, Mi, Pnn, Sr)
Pachliopta mariae almae (Semper, 1891) (P, Lz, Pl)
Pachliopta mariae camarines Schröder & Treadaway, 1978 (P, Lz)
Pachliopta leytensis Murayama, 1978 endemic
Pachliopta schadenbergi (Semper, 1891)
Pachliopta schadenbergi schadenbergi (Semper, 1891) (central & north-western Lz)
Pachliopta schadenbergi micholitzi (Semper, 1891) (Camiguin de Lz, north-eastern Lz)

genus: Papilio

Papilio slateri (Hewitson, 1857)
Papilio clytia (Linnaeus, 1758)
Papilio clytia cuyo Medicielo & Hanafusa, 1994 (Cy)
Papilio clytia palephates (Westwood, 1845) (Camiguin de Lz, Catanduanes, Lz, Mq, Mo, N, Py, Sr, Sq)
Papilio clytia panopinus (Staudinger, 1889) (Cn, Pn)
Papilio clytia visayensis M. Okano & T. Okano, 1978 (Bas, Bl, Cu, Jl, Le, Mo, N, Py, Sr, Sq)
Papilio osmana Jumalon, 1967 endemic
Papilio carolinensis Jumalon, 1967 endemic
Papilio paradoxa (Zinken, 1831)
Papilio paradoxa melanostoma Jordan, 1909 (Pn)
Papilio benguetanus Joicey & Talbot, 1923 endemic
Papilio demoleus Linnaeus, 1758
Papilio demoleus libanius Fruhstorfer, 1908
Papilio demolion Cramer, [1776]
Papilio demolion delostenus Rothschild, 1908 (Pn)
Papilio antonio Hewitson, 1875 endemic
Papilio antonio antonio Hewitson, 1875 (Le, Mi)
Papilio antonio niana Schröder & Treadaway, 1991 (N)
Papilio helenus Linnaeus, 1758
Papilio helenus hytaspes C. Felder & R. Felder, 1862
Papilio helenus palawanicus Staudinger, 1888 (Bl, Pn)
Papilio helenus boloboc Page & Treadaway, 1995 (Bng, Sng, Sb, Twi)
Papilio hipponous C. Felder & R. Felder, 1862
Papilio hipponous hipponous C. Felder & R. Felder, 1862 (Lz, Mq)
Papilio hipponous bazilanus Fruhstorfer, 1898 (Bl, Bas, Bl, Cn, Cu, Mi, N, Pn, Py, Sb, Twi)
Papilio karna irauana Jumalon, 1975 (Pn)
Papilio palinurus Fabricius, 1787
Papilio palinurus daedalus C. Felder & R. Felder, 1861
Papilio palinurus angustatus Staudinger, 1888 (Pn, Bl, Cy, Bus, Du)
Papilio palinurus selma Koçak, 1996
Papilio palinurus nymphodorus Fruhstorfer, 1909 (Bas)
Papilio chikae chikae Igarashi, 1965
Papilio chikae hermeli (Nuyda, 1992)
Papilio polytes Linnaeus, 1758
Papilio polytes pasikrates Fruhstorfer, 1898 (Bat)
Papilio polytes alphenor Cramer, [1776]
Papilio polytes ledebouria (Eschscholtz, 1821)
Papilio lowi H. Druce, 1873
Papilio rumanzovia rumanzovia Eschscholtz, 1821 endemic
Papilio rumanzovia tarawakana Page & Treadaway, 1995 (Bg, Sng, Sb, Twi)
Papilio luzviae Schröder & Treadaway, 1991endemic (Mq)
Papilio memnon memnon (Linnaeus, 1758)

genus: Graphium
Graphium empedovana empedovana (Corbet, 1941)
Graphium codrus (Cramer, [1776])
Graphium codrus melanthus (C. Felder & R. Felder, 1862) (Bl, Le, Lz, Mq, Me, Mo, Mi, N, Py, Sr, Sb)
Graphium codrus yayoeae Nihira & Kawamura, 1986 (Sng, Sb, Twi)
Graphium sarpedon sarpedon (Linnaeus, 1758)
Graphium sandawanum Yamamoto, 1977
Graphium doson (C. Felder & R. Felder, 1864)
Graphium doson evemonides Honrath, 1884 (Bl, Sng, Sb, Twi)
Graphium doson gyndes Fruhstorfer, 1907 (Cn, Pn)
Graphium doson nauta Tsukada & Nishiyama, 1980 (Bl, Cu, Dt, Hn, Le, Lz, Mq, Me, Mo, Mi, N, Py, Pnn, Sr, So, Sb, Sq, Ta, Tco)
Graphium doson postianus Fruhstorfer, 1902 (Bat)
Graphium eurypylus (Linnaeus, 1758)
Graphium eurypylus gordion (C. Felder & R. Felder, 1864) (P excluding Bl & Pn)
Graphium eurypylus mecisteus Distant, 1885 (Bl, Pn)
Graphium arycles (Boisduval, 1836)
Graphium arycles arycleoides Fruhstorfer, 1915
Graphium arycles perinthus Fruhstorfer, 1915 (Pn)
Graphium bathycles (Zinken, 1831)
Graphium bathycles bathycloides Honrath, 1884 (Pn)
Graphium agamemnon agamemnon (Linnaeus, 1758)
Graphium aristeus (Cramer, [1775])
Graphium aristeus hermocrates (C. Felder & R. Felder, 1864)
Graphium decolor (Staudinger, 1888)
Graphium decolor decolor (P, Bl, Cn, Pn)
Graphium decolor atratus (Rothschild, 1895) (P, Mo)
Graphium decolor neozebraica Page, 1987 (P, Bl, Le, Lz, Mq, Me, N, Pnn, Py, Pl, Sr, Sq, Tco)
Graphium decolor sibuyana Page, 1987 (P, Sn)
Graphium decolor tigris (Semper, 1892)
Graphium decolor rebeccae (Page & Treadaway, 2003) (P, Camiguin de Lz)
Graphium decolor jamesi (Page & Treadaway, 2003) (P, Sb, Sng)
Graphium euphrates (C. Felder & R. Felder, 1862)
Graphium euphrates euphrates (P, Bus, Cy, Hn, Le, Lz, Mq, Mi, Mo, Sr)
Graphium euphrates nisus Jordan (northern Lz)
Graphium euphrates domaranus (Fruhstorfer, 1903) (PPn, Du, Bl)
Graphium euphrates ornatus (Rothschild, 1895) (Halmahera, Ternate, Bachan)
Graphium euphrates Blensis Page, 1987 (P, Bl)
Graphium euphrates buhisanus Page, 1987 (P, Cu)
Graphium euphratoides (Eimer, 1889) endemic
Graphium macareus (Godart, 1819)
Graphium macareus palawanicola Koçak, 1980 (Pn)
Graphium megaera (Staudinger, 1888) (Bl, Pn)
Graphium ebertorum Koçak, 1983
Graphium stratocles (C. Felder & R. Felder, 1861)
Graphium stratocles stratocles (C. Felder & R. Felder, 1861) (Cn, Mo, Pn)
Graphium stratocles senectus Tsukada & Nishiyama, 1980 (Lz, Mq)
Graphium stratocles stratonices Jordan, 1909 (Mi – Bl, Dt, Le, Mi, Pnn, Sr)
Graphium delessertii (Guérin-Ménéville, 1839)
Graphium delessertii palawanus (Staudinger, 1889) (Pn)
Graphium idaeoides Hewitson, 1855

genus: Lamproptera

Lamproptera curius curius (Fabricius, 1787)
Lamproptera meges (Zinken, 1831)
Lamproptera meges decius C. Felder & R. Felder, 1862
Lamproptera meges pessimus Fruhstorfer, 1909 (Bl, Du, Pn, Twi)

Pieridae

genus: Catopsilia
Catopsilia pyranthe (Linnaeus, 1758)
Catopsilia pomona (Fabricius, 1775)
Catopsilia scylla (Linnaeus, 1763)
Catopsilia scylla cornelia (Fabricius, 1787)

genus: Gandaca

Gandaca harina (Horsfield, [1829])
Gandaca harina palawanica Fruhstorfer, 1910 (Cn, Pn)
Gandaca harina elis Fruhstorfer, 1910 (Sb)
Gandaca harina gardineri Fruhstorfer, 1910 (Bas, Bng, Jl, Sng, Twi)
Gandaca harina mindanaensis Fruhstorfer, 1910 (P excluding Bas, Cn, Pn, Sulu archipelago)

genus: Eurema

Eurema brigitta (Stoll, 1780)
Eurema brigitta baguioensis Schröder, Treadaway & Nuyda, 1990 (northern Lz)
Eurema brigitta sachikoi Tsukada & Nishiyama, 1990 (northern Mi)
Eurema brigitta roberto Schröder, Treadaway & Nuyda, 1990 (northern Mi)
Eurema brigitta siquijorana Schröder, Treadaway & Nuyda, 1990 (Sq)
Eurema laeta (Boisduval, 1836)
Eurema laeta semperi Moore, 1906 (northern Lz, Benguet Mountains)
Eurema hecabe (Linnaeus, 1758)
Eurema hecabe hecabe (Linnaeus, 1758) (Bl, Cn, northern Lz, Pn)
Eurema hecabe sintica Fruhstorfer, 1910 (Mo)
Eurema hecabe tamiathis Fruhstorfer, 1910 (P excluding Bl, Cn, northern Lz, Mo, Pn)
Eurema blanda (Boisduval, 1836)
Eurema blanda visellia Fruhstorfer, 1910 (Lz, Mo)
Eurema blanda mensia Fruhstorfer, 1910 (Bl, Cu, Le, N, Pnn, Sr)
Eurema blanda vallivolans Butler, 1863 (Bas, Bng, Cn, Dt, Mi, Pn, Sb, Twi)
Eurema simulatrix (Semper, 1891)
Eurema simulatrix simulatrix (Semper, 1891) (Bl, Le, Mi, Pnn, Sr)
Eurema simulatrix princesae Morishita, 1973 (Pn)
Eurema andersonii (Moore, 1886)
Eurema andersonii konoyi Morishita, (Pn)
Eurema andersonii prabha Fruhstorfer, 1910 (Pn)
Eurema hiurai Shirozu & Yata, 1977
Eurema hiurai hiurai Shirozu & Yata, 1977 (Mi)
Eurema hiurai admiranda Morishita, 1981 (Lz)
Eurema sari (Horsfield, [1829])
Eurema sari obucola Fruhstorfer, 1910 (Bl, Pn)
Eurema sarilata (Semper, 1891) endemic
Eurema sarilata sarilata (Semper, 1891) (Dt, Le, Mi, Pnn, Sr)
Eurema sarilata boholensis M. Okano & T. Okano, 1990 (Bl)
Eurema sarilata aquila Shirozu & Yata, 1982 (Cu, Lz, Mq)
Eurema sarilata dayani Treadaway & Nuyda, 1990 (Bng, Sng, Sb, Twi)
Eurema sarilata mindorana Butler, 1898 (Mo)
Eurema sarilata perplexa Shirozu & Yata, 1982 (Bas)
Eurema sarilata risa Morishita, 1981 (Me, N, Py)
Eurema sarilata rosario Treadaway & Nuyda, 1990 (Hn)
Eurema sarilata sibuyanensis Yata & Treadaway, 1982 (Sn)
Eurema sarilata bazilana Shirozu & Yata (Bas)
Eurema sarilata luzonensis Shirozu & Yata (Lz)
Eurema lacteola lacteola (Distant, 1886)
Eurema alitha (C. Felder & R. Felder, 1862)
Eurema alitha alitha C. Felder & R. Felder, 1862) (Mi)
Eurema alitha bazilana Fruhstorfer, 1900 (Bas)
Eurema alitha esakai Shirozu, 1953 (Bat)
Eurema alitha garama Fruhstorfer, 1910 (Bng, Jl, Sng, Sb, Twi)
Eurema alitha jalendra Fruhstorfer, 1910 (Bl, Bl, Cn, Cu, Du, Lz, Mq, Mo, Pn)
Eurema alitha Lensis Fruhstorfer, 1910 (Ca, Le)
Eurema alitha samarana Fruhstorfer, 1910 (Sr)

genus: Delias

Delias singhapura (Wallace, 1867)
Delias singhapura yusukei (Nakano, 1988) (Pn)
Delias themis (Hewitson, 1861)
Delias themis themis (Hewitson, 1861) (Bl, Cu, Mi, Sr)
Delias themis kawamurai Nakano, 1993 (Mo)
Delias themis mihoae Nakano, 1993 (N)
Delias themis soteira Fruhstorfer, 1910 (Lz, Mq, Pl)
Delias themis yuii Nakano, 1993 (Me, Pnn)
Delias baracasa Semper, 1890
Delias baracasa baracasa Semper, 1890 Mi
Delias baracasa benguetana Inomata, 1979 (northern Lz)
Delias nuydaorum Schröder, 1975 (northern Mi)
Delias paoaiensis Nihira & Kawamura, 1987 (northern Lz)
Delias hyparete (Linnaeus, 1758)
Delias hyparete luzonensis C. Felder & R. Felder, 1862 (Bl, Cu, Le, Lz, Mq, Mo, N, Py, Pnn, Pl, Sr, Sn)
Delias hyparete domorana Fruhstorfer, 1911 (Du)
Delias hyparete mindanaensis Mitis, 1893 (Dt, Mi)
Delias hyparete palawanica Staudinger, 1889 (Cn, Pn)
Delias hyparete lucina Distant & Pryer, 1887 (Cagayan Sulu, Jl)
Delias hyparete melville Yagashita, 1993 (Bl)
Delias hyparete panayensis Rothschild (Py)
Delias woodi Talbot, 1928
Delias woodi woodi Talbot, 1928 (southern Mi (Mt. Apo))
Delias woodi colini Schröder, 1977 (northern/northeastern Mi)
Delias woodi tholi (southern Mi (Mt. Parker))
Delias blanca C. Felder & R. Felder, 1862
Delias blanca blanca C. Felder & R. Felder, 1862 (north-east Lz)
Delias blanca apameia Fruhstorfer, 1910 (Mi)
Delias blanca capcoi Jumalon, 1975 (N)
Delias blanca uichancoi Jumalon, 1975 (Bl)
Delias pasithoe (Linnaeus, 1767)
Delias pasithoe balabaca Fruhstorfer, 1911 (Bl)
Delias pasithoe mera Talbot, 1928 (Lz, Mi)
Delias pasithoe pandecta Staudinger, 1889 (Pn)
Delias hidecoae Nakano, 1993 Mo (Mt. Halcon)
Delias henningia (Eschscholtz, 1821)
Delias henningia henningia Eschscholtz, 1821 (Cu, Le, Lz, Mq, Me, Mo, N, Py, Sr)
Delias henningia ochreopicta Butler, 1869 (Mi, Pnn)
Delias henningia camotana Fruhstorfer, 1910 (Ca)
Delias henningia pandemia Wallace, 1867 (Cn, Pn)
Delias henningia omblonensis Nakano & Yagashita, 1993 (Romblon, Sn)
Delias henningia voconia Fruhstorfer, 1910 (Bl)
Delias ottonia Semper, 1890 (southeastern Mi)
Delias mandaya Yamamoto & Takei, 1982 (eastern Mi)
Delias levicki Rothschild, 1927
Delias levicki levicki Rothschild, 1927 (southern Mi (Mt. Apo))
Delias levicki borromeoi (eastern Mi (Mt. Parker))
Delias levicki justini Samusawa & Kawamura, 1988 (northern Mi (Mt. Kitanlad))
Delias apoensis Talbot, 1928
Delias apoensis apoensis Talbot, 1928 (southern Mi (Mt. Apo))
Delias apoensis maizurui Yagashita & Nakano, 1993 (northern Mi (Mt. Kitanlad))
Delias ganymedes Okumoto, 1981
Delias ganymedes ganymedes Okumoto, 1981 (northern N)
Delias ganymedes filarorum Nihira & Kawamura, 1988 (western Py)
Delias ganymedes halconensis Nakano & Yagashita, 1993 (northern Mo (Mt. Halcon))
Delias georgina georgina (C. Felder & R. Felder, 1861) (northern Lz)
Delias schoenigi Schröder, 1975
Delias schoenigi schoenigi Schröder, 1975 (southern Mi (Mt. Apo))
Delias schoenigi hermeli Samusawa & Kawamura, 1988 (northern Mi (Mt. Kitanlad))
Delias schoenigi malindangeana Nakano & Yagashita, 1993 (north(western Mi (Mt. Malindang)))
Delias schoenigi pasiana Yagashita, 1993 (eastern Mi (Mt. Pasian))
Delias diaphana Semper, 1878
Delias diaphana diaphana Semper, 1878 (northern, southern & central Mi)
Delias diaphana basilisae Schröder & Treadaway, 1983 (north(western Mi))
Delias diaphana morishitai Nakano, 1993 (eastern Mi (Mt. Pasian))
Delias diaphana sakagutii Tsukada & Nishiyama, 1980 (south(eastern Mi)
Delias diaphana yatai Nakano, 1993 (eastern Mi (Tandga))

genus: Pieris

Pieris canidia canidia (Linnaeus, 1768) (northern Lz)

genus: Leptosia

Leptosia nina (Fabricius, 1793)
Leptosia nina terentia Fruhstorfer, 1910 (Bas, Cn, Cu, Cy, Mo, Mi, Pn, Py)
Leptosia nina georgi Fruhstorfer, 1910 (Lz)
Leptosia nina asukae Nihira & Kawamura, 1986 (Jl)
Leptosia nina malayana Fruhstorfer, 1910 (Sng, Sb, Twi)

genus: Cepora
Cepora boisduvaliana (C. Felder & R. Felder, 1862)
Cepora boisduvaliana boisduvaliana (C. Felder & R. Felder, 1862) (Lz, Mq, Me, Mo, Py)
Cepora boisduvaliana balbagona Semper, 1890 (Camiguin de Mi)
Cepora boisduvaliana Cuensis Schröder, 1977 (Cu)
Cepora boisduvaliana cirta Fruhstorfer, 1910 (Bl)
Cepora boisduvaliana lytensis M. Okano & T. Okano, 1991 (Le)
Cepora boisduvaliana negrosensis M. Okano & T. Okano, 1991 (N)
Cepora boisduvaliana semperi Staudinger, 1890 (Bas, Mi, Sr, Tco)
Cepora boisduvaliana sibuyanensis Schröder, 1977 (Sn)
Cepora aspasia (Stoll, [1790])
Cepora aspasia olga Eschscholtz, 1821 (central to southern Lz)
Cepora aspasia anaitis Fruhstorfer, 1910 (north(western Lz
Cepora aspasia fulcinea Fruhstorfer, 1911 (Pl
Cepora aspasia irma Fruhstorfer, 1910 (Bng, Jl, Sng, Si, Twi)
Cepora aspasia olgina (Staudinger, 1889) (Cn, Pn)
Cepora aspasia orantia Fruhstorfer, 1910 (Bl, Le, Mi)
Cepora aspasia phokaia Fruhstorfer, 1910 (Bl)
Cepora aspasia poetelia Fruhstorfer (Camiguin de Mi)
Cepora aspasia rhemia Fruhstorfer, 1910 (Me, Mo, N, Py, Sn)
Cepora aspasia tolmida Fruhstorfer, 1911 (Cu, Ca)
Cepora aspasia zisca Fruhstorfer, 1899 (Bas)

genus: Appias

Appias olferna Swinhoe, 1890
Appias olferna peducaea Fruhstorfer, 1910 (Bl, Cu, Jl, Lz, Mq, Mo, Mi, N, Pn)
Appias lyncida (Cramer, [1777])
Appias lyncida enarentina Fruhstorfer, 1900 (Bl, Cn, Pn)
Appias lyncida andrea Eschscholtz, 1821 - Lz, Mq, Mo, Mi)
Appias lyncida lepidana Fruhstorfer, 1910- Gu, N, Py)
Appias lyncida maccina Fruhstorfer, 1911 (Cy, Du)
Appias lyncida subenarete Schröder & Treadaway, 1989 (Sng, Twi)
Appias nero (Fabricius, 1793)
Appias nero palawanicus (Staudinger, 1889) (Bl, Pn)
Appias nero domitia C. Felder & R. Felder, 1862 (Lz, Mq, Me)
Appias nero corazonae Schröder & Treadaway, 1989 (Bng, Sng, Sb)
Appias nero fleminius Fruhstorfer, 1911 (Mo)
Appias nero soranus Fruhstorfer, 1910 (Cu, N, Py, Sn)
Appias nero tibericus Fruhstorfer, 1910 (Bas)
Appias nero zamboanga C. Felder & R. Felder, 1862 (Bl, Dt, Le, Mi, Pnn, Sr)
Appias nephele Hewitson, 1861 endemic
Appias nephele nephele Hewitson, 1861 (Lz)
Appias nephele aufidia Fruhstorfer, 1910 (Bas)
Appias nephele dilutior (Staudinger, 1889) (Cn, Pn)
Appias nephele elis Fruhstorfer, 1910 (Mi)
Appias nephele hostilia Fruhstorfer, 1910 (Jl)
Appias nephele invitabilis Fruhstorfer, 1910 (Mo)
Appias nephele Lensis Fruhstorfer, 1911 (Le, Sr)
Appias nephele tawitawiana Schröder & Treadaway, 1993 (Twi)
Appias indra (Moore, 1857)
Appias indra treadawayi Schröder, 1975 (northern & north-western Mi (Mt. Kitanlad & Malindang))
Appias indra massilia Fruhstorfer, 1910 (Pn)
Appias phoebe (C. Felder & R. Felder, 1861)
Appias phoebe phoebe (C. Felder & R. Felder, 1861) (northern Lz)
Appias phoebe mindana Yamamoto & Takei, 1980 (north-western Mi)
Appias phoebe montana Rothschild, 1896 (N (6,000-7,000 feet))
Appias phoebe rowelli Schröder & Treadaway, 1982 (south Pn)
Appias phoebe zamorra C. Felder & R. Felder, 1862 (Mo)
Appias paulina (Cramer, [1777])
Appias paulina agave (C. Felder & R. Felder, 1862) (Dt, Hn, Le, Lz, Mq, Mi, N Pnn, Sr)
Appias paulina athena Fruhstorfer, 1902 (Bng, Sng, Sb, Twi)
Appias paulina nikomedeia Fruhstorfer, 1910 (Bas)
Appias paulina plaethoria Fruhstorfer, 1910 (Bl)
Appias paulina sithonia Fruhstorfer, 1911 (Mo)
Appias paulina terentilia Fruhstorfer, 1910 (Cn, Pn)
Appias maria Semper, 1875
Appias maria maria Semper, 1875 (Lz, Mq)
Appias maria adorabilis Fruhstorfer, 1910 (Le, Mi, N, Sr)
Appias maria dolorosa Fruhstorfer, 1910 (Bl)
Appias maria kobayashii Nuyda & Kawamura, 1989 (Py)
Appias albina (Boisduval, 1836)
Appias albina albina (Boisduval, 1836) (Bl, Bng, central & southern Pn, Sng, Sb, Twi)
Appias albina pancheia Fruhstorfer, 1910 (Mi, northern Pn
Appias albina semperi Moore, 1905 (Ba, Bl, Cu, Du, Gu, Lz, Mq, Mo, N)
Appias albina agatha Staudinger
Appias remedios Schröder & Treadaway, 1980 (western Py)
Appias waltraudae Schröder, 1977 (centralPn)
Appias aegis (C. Felder & R. Felder, 1861)
Appias aegis aegis (C. Felder & R. Felder, 1861) (Le, Mi, Sr)
Appias aegis caepia Fruhstorfer, 1910 (Pn)
Appias aegis illana (C. Felder & R. Felder, 1862) (Ba, Cu, Lz, Mq, Mo, N)
Appias aegis sibutana Schröder & Treadaway, 1989 (Sb)

genus: Udaiana

Udaiana cynis suluensis Schröder & Treadaway, 1989 (Bng, Sng, Twi)

genus: Ixias

Ixias clarki Avinoff, 1925 (northern Lz, Mi)

genus: Saletara
Saletara panda (Godart, 1819)
Saletara panda nathalia ((C. Felder & R. Felder, 1862) (Lz, Mq, Me, N, Py, Pl)
Saletara panda distanti Butler, 1898 (Sng, Twi)
Saletara panda erebina Fruhstorfer, 1900 (Pn)
Saletara panda hostilia Fruhstorfer, 1910 (Bl)
Saletara panda martia Fruhstorfer, 1910 (Bas)
Saletara panda nargosa Fruhstorfer, 1910 (Dt, Homonhan, Le, Mi, Sr)

genus: Pareronia

Pareronia valeria (Cramer, [1776])
Pareronia valeriaPna Fruhstorfer, 1900 (Bl, Cn, Pn)
Pareronia valeria calliparga Fruhstorfer, 1910 (Du)
Pareronia valeria gulussa Fruhstorfer, 1910 (Cy)
Pareronia valeria valeriana Schröder & Treadaway, 1991 ((Twi)
Pareronia nishiyamai Yata, 1981 (Pn (Cn, Cy, Pn)
Pareronia phocaea (C. Felder & R. Felder, 1861) endemic
Pareronia phocaea phocaea (C. Felder & R. Felder, 1861) (Mi)
Pareronia phocaea ariamena Fruhstorfer, 1910 (Bas)
Pareronia boebera (Eschscholtz, 1821) endemic
Pareronia boebera boebera (Eschscholtz, 1821) (Lz, Mq, Mo, Pl)
Pareronia boebera arsamota Fruhstorfer, 1910 (Bl, Cu, Me, N, Py, Sn)
Pareronia boebera bazilana Fruhstorfer, 1900 (Bas)
Pareronia boebera elaitia Fruhstorfer, 1910 (Pnn)
Pareronia boebera joloana Fruhstorfer, 1911 (Jl)
Pareronia boebera mutya Treadaway & Nuyda, 1994 (Bng, Sng, Sb, Twi)
Pareronia boebera trinobantes Fruhstorfer, 1911 (Le, Mi, Sr)

genus: Hebomoia

Hebomoia glaucippe (Linnaeus, 1758)
Hebomoia glaucippe philippensis Wallace, 1863 (central & southern Lz, Mq)
Hebomoia glaucippe Blensis M. Okano & T. Okano, 1994 (Bl, Me, N, Py)
Hebomoia glaucippe cuyonicola Fruhstorfer, 1907 (Cy)
Hebomoia glaucippe domoranensis Fruhstorfer, 1911 (Du)
Hebomoia glaucippe erinna Fruhstorfer, 1910 (Babuyan, Bat, northern Lz)
Hebomoia glaucippe iliaca Fruhstorfer, 1911 (Bng, Dt, Jl, Le, Mi, Pnn, Sr, Sng, Sb, Twi)
Hebomoia glaucippe mindorensis Fruhstorfer, 1911 (Mo)
Hebomoia glaucippe palawensis Fruhstorfer, 1907 (Bl, Cn, Pn)
Hebomoia glaucippe reducta Fruhstorfer, 1907 (Pl)

Nymphalidae

genus: Ariadne
Ariadne merione (Cramer, [1777])
Ariadne merione crestonia (Fruhstorfer, 1912) (Bl, Pn)
Ariadne merione luzonica (C. Felder & R. Felder, [1867]) (P excluding Ba, Bl, northern Lz, Pn)
Ariadne taeniata (C. Felder & R. Felder, 1861) endemic
Ariadne taeniata taeniata (C. Felder & R. Felder, 1861) (Ba, Lz, Mq, Me, N)
Ariadne taeniata adelpha (C. Felder & R. Felder, 1861) (Bas, Bl, Cu, Le, Mi)

genus: Laringa

Laringa castelnaui (C. Felder & R. Felder, 1860)
Laringa castelnaui ottonis Fruhstorfer, 1906 (Pn)

genus: Cethosia

Cethosia biblis (Drury, [1773])
Cethosia biblis barangingi Tsukada, 1985 (Bg, Jl, Sng, Sb, Twi)
Cethosia biblis insularis C. Felder & R. Felder, 1861 (Ba, Lz)
Cethosia biblis liacura Fruhstorfer, 1912 (central & western Mi)
Cethosia biblis placito Tsukada, 1985 (eastern Mi)
Cethosia biblis sandakana Fruhstorfer, 1899 (Bl, Cu, Ca, Cuyo, Le, Mq, Me, Mi, N, Py, Sr, Si)
Cethosia biblis tagalorum Fruhstorfer (Mo)
Cethosia hypsea Doubleday, [1847]
Cethosia hypsea palawana Fruhstorfer, 1900 (Bl, Cn, Pn)
Cethosia mindanensis C. Felder & R. Felder, 1863
Cethosia mindanensis mindanensis C. Felder & R. Felder, 1863 (Bas, south-western Mi)
Cethosia mindanensis festiva Fruhstorfer, 1899 (Bg, Jl, Sng, Si, Sb, Twi)
Cethosia luzonica C. Felder & R. Felder, 1863 endemic
Cethosia luzonica luzonica C. Felder & R. Felder, 1863 (Lz)
Cethosia luzonica boholica Semper, 1888 (Bl, Cu, Le, Pnn, Sr)
Cethosia luzonica magindanica Semper, 1888 (Mi)
Cethosia luzonica pariana Semper, 1888 (Guimaras, Me, N, Py, Sn)

genus: Vindula

Vindula erota (Fabricius, 1793)
Vindula erota montana Fruhstorfer, 1899 (Bl, Pn)
Vindula dejone (Erichson, 1834)
Vindula dejone dejone (Erichson, 1834) (Bl, Cn, Dt, Le, Lz, Mq, Me, Mo, Mi, N, northern Pn, Py, Sr)
Vindula dejone basanica Fruhstorfer, 1912 (Jl)
Vindula dejone bongana Schröder & Treadaway, 1989 (Bg, Sng)
Vindula dejone palawanica Fruhstorfer, 1899 (Bl, S, Pn)
Vindula dejone sibutuensis Schröder & Treadaway, 1989 (Sb)

genus: Cupha

Cupha erymanthis (Drury, [1773])
Cupha erymanthis erymanthis (Drury, [1773]) (Bl, Bg, Cn, Pn, Sng, Si, Twi)
Cupha erymanthis palawana (Fruhstorfer (Pn, Bl)
Cupha arias C. Felder & R. Felder, [1867]
Cupha arias arias C. Felder & R. Felder, [1867] (P excluding Bas, Dt, Le, Mi, Pnn, Sr, Sb, Twi)
Cupha arias dapatana Grose-Smith, 1887 (Bas, Dt, Le, Mi, Pnn, Sr, Sb, Twi)
Cupha arias cacina Fruhstorfer (Pn, (Balabac))

genus: Phalanta

Phalanta phalantha (Drury, [1773])
Phalanta phalantha phalantha (Drury, [1773]) (P)
Phalanta phalantha luzonica Fruhstorfer (P)
Phalanta alcippe (Stoll, 1782)
Phalanta alcippe alcippoides Moore, 1900 (Bl, Pn, Sng, Sb, Twi)
Phalanta alcippe semperi Moore, 1900 (P excluding Bl, Bas, Pn, Sng, Sb, Twi)
Phalanta alcippe violetta Fruhstorfer, 1900 (Bas)
Phalanta alcippe pallidior Staudinger (Pn)

genus: Vagrans

Vagrans egista (Cramer, [1780])
Vagrans egista brixia (Fruhstorfer) (northern P)
Vagrans sinha (Kollar, [1844])

genus: Paduca

Paduca fasciata (C. Felder & R. Felder, 1860)
Paduca fasciata fasciata (C. Felder & R. Felder, 1860) (P excluding Cn, Pn)
Paduca fasciata palloris Fruhstorfer, 1900 (Cn, Pn)
Paduca fasciata ortopia Fruhstorfer (southern to central P)

genus: Cirrochroa

Cirrochroa tyche (C. Felder & R. Felder, 1861)
Cirrochroa tyche tyche (C. Felder & R. Felder, 1861)
Cirrochroa tyche guimarensis Fruhstorfer (P excluding Cn, Dumaran, Pn, Twi)
Cirrochroa tyche domorana Fruhstorfer) (P excluding Cn, Dumaran, Pn, Twi)
Cirrochroa tyche laudabilis Fruhstorfer, 1900 (Cn, Dumaran, Pn)
Cirrochroa tyche languyana Treadaway & Nuyda, 1994 (Twi)
Cirrochroa satellita Butler, 1869
Cirrochroa satellita illergeta Fruhstorfer, 1912 (Pn)
Cirrochroa menones Semper, 1888

genus: Terinos

Terinos clarissa Boisduval, 1836
Terinos clarissa homonhonensis Treadaway & Nuyda, 1994 (Homonhon)
Terinos clarissa suluensis Treadaway & Nuyda, 1994 (Bg, Sng, Twi)
Terinos clarissa lucia Staudinger, 1889 (Pn)
Terinos clarissa luciella Fruhstorfer, 1912 (Bl)
Terinos clarissa lucilla Butler, 1870 (Le, Mi, Sr)
Terinos romeo Schröder and Treadaway, 1984

genus: Argynnis

Argynnis hyperbius (Linnaeus, 1763)
Argynnis hyperbius sagada Fruhstorfer, 1912 (N. Lz, N. Mi, Ba)

genus: Vanessa

Vanessa cardui (Linnaeus, 1758)
Vanessa indica (Herbst, 1764)
Vanessa dejeani mounseyi Talbot, 1936

genus: Kaniska

Kaniska canace (Linnaeus, 1763)
Kaniska canace benguetana Semper, 1888 (Lz, N. Mi)
Kaniska canace oreas Tsukada, 1985 (Py)
Kaniska canace oplentia Tsukada, 1985 (Mi)
Kaniska canace maniliana (Fruhstorfer, 1912) (Pn)

genus: Symbrenthia

Symbrenthia lilaea (Hewitson, 1864)
Symbrenthia lilaea semperi Moore, 1889 (P excluding Bl, Lz, Pn, Sulu Archipelago)
Symbrenthia lilaea thimo Fruhstorfer, 1907 (Lz)
Symbrenthia hippoclus (Cramer, [1779])
Symbrenthia hippoclus (Cramer, [1779])
Symbrenthia hippoclus anna Semper, 1888 (Bl, Cu, Camiguin de Mi, Ca, Le, Mi, Pnn, Sr, Siargao)
Symbrenthia hippoclus aritus Fruhstorfer, 1912 (Cn)
Symbrenthia hippoclus galepsus Fruhstorfer, 1908 (Lz, Mq, Mo)
Symbrenthia hippoclus dissoluta Staudinger, 1889 (Bl, Pn)
Symbrenthia hippoclus jolonus Fruhstorfer, 1912 (Jl)
Symbrenthia hippoclus spherchius Fruhstorfer, 1908 (Bas)
Symbrenthia hypselis (Godart, [1824])
Symbrenthia hypselis niphandina Fruhstorfer, 1912 (Pn)
Symbrenthia hypatia (Wallace, 1869)
Symbrenthia hypatia mindanaensis Schröder & Treadaway, 1979 (Mi, P)

genus: Junonia

Junonia iphita (Cramer, [1779])
Junonia iphita adelaida (Staudinger, 1889) (Bl, Pn)
Junonia hedonia (Linnaeus, 1764)
Junonia hedonia ida (Cramer, [1775]) (P)
Junonia hedonia hondai Hayashi, 1973 (Pn)
Junonia atlites atlites (Linnaeus, 1758)
Junonia almana almana (Linnaeus, 1758)
Junonia lemonias (Linnaeus, 1758)
Junonia lemonias janome Tsukada & Kaneko, 1985 (Cu, Guimaras, Lz, Mq, Mo, Pn)
Junonia orithya (Linnaeus, 1758)
Junonia orithya leucasia Fruhstorfer, 1912 (P excluding Sb)
Junonia orithya metion Fruhstorfer, 1905 (Sb)

genus: Rhinopalpa

Rhinopalpa polynice (Cramer, [1779])
Rhinopalpa polynice amoenice Fruhstorfer, 1912 (Mo)
Rhinopalpa polynice panayana Fruhstorfer, 1912 (Cu, N, W, Py, Sn)
Rhinopalpa polynice stratonice C. Felder & R. Felder, 1867 (Ba, Lz, Mq)
Rhinopalpa polynice tamora Fruhstorfer, 1900 (Bas)
Rhinopalpa polynice tawanice Schröder & Treadaway, 1989 (Bg, Sng, Sb, Twi
Rhinopalpa polynice validice Fruhstorfer, 1912 (Bohol, Dt, Le, Mi, Pnn, Sr, Siargao)

genus: Yoma

Yoma sabina (Cramer, [1780])
Yoma sabina podium Tsukada, 1985 (P)

genus: Hypolimnas

Hypolimnas anomala (Wallace, 1869)
Hypolimnas anomala anomala (Wallace, 1869) (P)
Hypolimnas anomala euvaristos Fruhstorfer (Mi and southern islands)
Hypolimnas anomala truentus Fruhstorfer (Lz, ?Ba)
Hypolimnas misippus (Linnaeus, 1764)
Hypolimnas bolina (Linnaeus, 1758)
Hypolimnas bolina joloana Fruhstorfer, 1912 (Bg, Jl, Sng, Sb, Twi)
Hypolimnas bolina kezia Butler, 1877 (Batanes)
Hypolimnas bolina philippensis Butler, 1874 (P excluding Batanes, Bg, Jl, Sng, Sb, Twi)

genus: Doleschallia

Doleschallia bisaltide C. Felder & R. Felder, 1860
Doleschallia bisaltide philippensis Fruhstorfer, 1899 (P)

genus: Cyrestis

Cyrestis cassander C. Felder & R. Felder, 1863
Cyrestis cassander cassander C. Felder & R. Felder, 1863 (Batanes, Lz, Mq, Mo)
Cyrestis cassander dacebalus Fruhstorfer, 1912 (Bl, Ca, Dt, Gu, Le, Sr)
Cyrestis cassander orchomenus Fruhstorfer, 1912 (Bas, Mi
Cyrestis cassander thessa Fruhstorfer, 1889 (Bl, Cn, Pn)
Cyrestis maenalis Erichson, 1834
Cyrestis maenalis maenalis Erichson, 1834 (Lz, Mq, Py, Sb)
Cyrestis maenalis aiedius Fruhstorfer, 1912 (Bl)
Cyrestis maenalis cebuensis M. Okano & T. Okano, 1988 (Cu)
Cyrestis maenalis eumeleus Fruhstorfer, 1915 (Ba)
Cyrestis maenalis kynosura Tsukada & Nishiyama, 1985 (Dt, Le, Pnn)
Cyrestis maenalis N Martin, 1903 (N)
Cyrestis maenalis obscurior Staudinger, 1889 (Cn, Pn, Bl)
Cyrestis maenalis oebasius Fruhstorfer, 1912 (Bas
Cyrestis maenalis rizali Tsukada & Nishiyama, 1985 (Bl, E. Mi)
Cyrestis maenalis rothschildi Martin, 1903 (Mo)
Cyrestis maenalis zamboangensis Jumalon, 1975 (SW. Mi)
Cyrestis kudrati Jumalon, 1975 endemic (Mi)
Cyrestis nivea (Zinken, 1831)
Cyrestis nivea superbus Staudinger, 1889 (Cn, Pn)

genus: Chersonesia

Chersonesia rahria (Moore, [1858])
Chersonesia peraka Distant, 1884
Chersonesia intermedia Martin, 1895
Chersonesia excellens Martin, 1902

genus: Pandita

Pandita sinope Moore, [1858]
Pandita sinope sinoria C. Felder & R. Felder, 1867 (Pn, Cns)
Pandita sinope satyrus Schröder & Treadaway, 2003 (Twi)

genus: Moduza

Moduza thespias Semper, 1889 endemic
Moduza procris (Cramer, [1777])
Moduza procris beckyae Schröder & Treadaway, 1987 (Bl)
Moduza procris pausanias (Staudinger, 1889) (Cn, Pn)
Moduza procris liberalis (Tsukada, 1991 (Bg, Sng, Sb, Twi)
Moduza mata (Moore, [1858]) endemic
Moduza mata mata (Moore, [1858]) (Lz, Mq)
Moduza mata amida Fruhstorfer, 1912 (Cu, Le, Me, Mi, N, Py, Sb)
Moduza mata mindorana Tsukada, 1991 (Mo)
Moduza mata avalokita Fruhstorfer (Mi)
Moduza urdaneta (C. Felder & R. Felder, 1863) endemic
Moduza urdaneta urdaneta (C. Felder & R. Felder, 1863) (Lz, Mi)
Moduza urdaneta aynii Nuyda, 1993 (Camiguin de Lz)
Moduza urdaneta kawamurai Hanafusa, 1987 (Polillo)
Moduza urdaneta miyabi Tsukada, 1991 (Mo)
Moduza pintuyana (Semper, 1878) endemic
Moduza pintuyana pintuyana (Semper, 1878) (Le, Mi, Pnn, Sr)
Moduza pintuyana gahiti M. Okano & T. Okano, 1989 (Bl, Dt, Homonhon)
Moduza pintuyana mahastha Fruhstorfer, 1913 (Bas)
Moduza pintuyana tawitawiensis Treadaway & Nuyda, 1994 (Sng, Twi)
Moduza nuydai Shirozu & Saigusa, 1970 endemic
Moduza nuydai nuydai Shirozu & Saigusa, 1970 (northern Lz)
Moduza nuydai hyugai Treadaway & Nuyda, 1993 (northern Mi (Mt. Halcon))
Moduza jumaloni (Schröder, 1976) endemic
Moduza jumaloni jumaloni (Schröder, 1976) (Me, N, Py)
Moduza jumaloni punctata (Schröder & Treadaway, 1980) (Sn, Romblon)

genus: Athyma

Athyma pravara Schröder & Treadaway, 1980
Athyma salvini Fruhstorfer, 1912
Athyma alcamene C. Felder & R. Felder, 1863
Athyma alcamene alcamene C. Felder & R. Felder, 1863 (Bas, Bl, Le, Mi, Pnn, Sr)
Athyma alcamene angelesi Schröder & Treadaway, 1992 (Twi)
Athyma alcamene baltazarae Jumalon, 1975 (N, western Pnn)
Athyma alcamene generosior Fruhstorfer, 1906 (Mo)
Athyma alcamene jagori Fruhstorfer, 1906 (Lz)
Athyma alcamene mensis (Schröder & Treadaway, 1991 (Me)
Athyma reta suluana (Schröder & Treadaway, 1991
Athyma arayata C. Felder & R. Felder, 1863
Athyma maenas C. Felder & R. Felder, 1863
Athyma maenas maenas C. Felder & R. Felder, 1863 (Burias, Lz)
Athyma maenas semperi Moore, 1896 (Bas, Bl, Dt, Le, Mi, Pnn, Sr)
Athyma maenas maenides Fruhstorfer (Bas)
Athyma speciosa Staudinger, 1889 endemic
Athyma speciosa Staudinger, 1889 (Pn, Bl)
Athyma speciosa speciosa Staudinger, 1889 (Cn, Pn)
Athyma speciosa preciosa Fruhstorfer, 1912 (Bl)
Athyma kasa Moore, 1858
Athyma kasa kasa Moore, 1858 (Ba, Lz, Mq, Polillo)
Athyma kasa bignayana Fruhstorfer, 1906 (Gu, Me, N, Py, Sb, Siquijor)
Athyma kasa epimethis C. Felder & R. Felder, 1863 (Mo)
Athyma kasa gordia C. Felder & R. Felder, 1863 (Bas, Camiguin de Mi, Dt, Mi)
Athyma kasa leyteana Murayama, 1982 (Le, Sr)
Athyma kasa paragordia Semper, 1889 (Bl)
Athyma kasa parakasa Semper, 1889 (Cu, Ca, Mi)
Athyma kasa kasina Fruhstorfer (Lz)
Athyma kasa privata Fruhstorfer (locality unknown)
Athyma kasa bazilana Fruhstorfer (Bas)
Athyma saskia (Schröder & Treadaway, 1991
Athyma godmani Staudinger, 1889
Athyma godmani godmani Staudinger, 1889 (Pn)
Athyma godmani reducta Fruhstorfer, 1906 (Bl)
Athyma venata Staudinger, 1889
Athyma separata Staudinger, 1889
Athyma separata separata Staudinger, 1889 (Pn)
Athyma separata gracilis Schröder, Treadaway & Nuyda, 1990 (Cn)
Athyma asura Moore, 1858
Athyma mindanica Murayama, 1978
Athyma obsoleta Schröder & Treadaway, 1979
Athyma perius perius (Linnaeus, 1758)
Athyma nefte (Cramer, [1779])
Athyma nefte subrata Moore, 1858 (Bg, Sng, Sb, Twi)
Athyma selenophora (Kollar, [1844])
Athyma selenophora shiraishii Tsukada & Kaneko, 1985 (Pn)

genus: Tacola

Tacola larymna (Doubleday, [1848])
Tacola larymna agina Fruhstorfer, 1898 (Pn)
Tacola larymna negrosiana (Schröder & Treadaway, 1988) (northern N)
Tacola larymna panayana Schröder & Treadaway, 1979 (western Py)
Tacola magindana (Semper, 1878) endemic
Tacola magindana magindana (Semper, 1878) (Le, Mi, Sr)
Tacola magindana pizarrasi M. Okano & T. Okano, 1988 (Bl)
Tacola magindana zilana Fruhstorfer, 1906 (Bas)

genus: Tarratia

Tarratia gutama (Moore, 1858)
Tarratia gutama gutama (Moore, 1858) (Ba, Lz, Mo)
Tarratia gutama canlaonensis M. Okano & T. Okano, 1986 (N)
Tarratia gutama cebuensis M. Okano & T. Okano, 1986 (Cu)
Tarratia gutama sibuyana Tsukada, 1991 (Sn)
Tarratia gutama teldeniya Fruhstorfer, 1912 (Bl, Cn, Pn)
Tarratia cosmia (Semper, 1878)
Tarratia cosmia cosmia (Semper, 1878) (Bl, Bg, Ca, Dt, Le, Mi, Sr, Sng, Sb, Twi)
Tarratia cosmia pindola Fruhstorfer, 1906 (Bas)

genus: Lebadea

Lebadea martha (Fabricius, 1787)
Lebadea martha jecieli Schröder, Treadaway & Nuyda, 1990 (Cn)
Lebadea martha paulina Staudinger, 1889 (Bl, Pn)
Lebadea martha undulata Schröder, Treadaway & Nuyda, 1990 (Sng)
Lebadea martha tessellata Schröder, Treadaway & Nuyda, 1990 (Sb)

genus: Parthenos

Parthenos sylvia (Cramer, [1775])
Parthenos sylvia butlerinus Fruhstorfer, 1898 (Bazlabac, Dumaran, Pn)
Parthenos sylvia jaloensis Fruhstorfer, 1898 (Jl)
Parthenos sylvia philippensis Fruhstorfer, 1898 (P excluding Bl, Bg, Dumaran, Jl, Pn, Sng, Sb, Twi)
Parthenos sylvia selene (Schröder & Treadaway, 1991 (Bg, Sng, Sb, Twi)

genus: Tanaecia

Tanaecia calliphorus C. Felder & R. Felder, 1863
Tanaecia calliphorus calliphorus (C. Felder & R. Felder, 1863) (Lz, Mq, Polillo)
Tanaecia calliphorus smaragdifera Fruhstorfer, 1912 (Mo)
Tanaecia calliphorus treadawayi Tsukada, 1991 (Sn)
Tanaecia calliphorus volupia Tsukada & Nishiyama, 1981 (Camiguin de Lz)
Tanaecia dodong (Schröder & Treadaway, 1878) endemic
Tanaecia susoni Jumalon, 1975 endemic
Tanaecia lupina H. Druce, 1874 endemic
Tanaecia lupina lupina H. Druce, 1874 (Jl)
Tanaecia lupina borromeoi Schröder, 1977 (Sn)
Tanaecia lupina howarthi Jumalon, 1975 (N)
Tanaecia lupina panayana Schröder & Treadaway, 1980 (Py)
Tanaecia leucotaenia Semper, 1878 endemic
Tanaecia leucotaenia leucotaenia Semper, 1878 (Biliran, Bl, Ca, Le, Pnn, Sr)
Tanaecia leucotaenia aquamarina Fruhstorfer, 1912 (Mi)
Tanaecia leucotaenia dinorah Fruhstorfer, 1899 (Bas)
Tanaecia leucotaenia exul Tsukada & Nishiyama, 1980 (Dt
Tanaecia leucotaenia kulaya Treadaway & Nuyda, 1994 (Homonhon)
Tanaecia aruna (C. Felder & R. Felder, 1860)
Tanaecia aruna pallida Schröder, Treadaway & Nuyda, 1990 (Cn)
Tanaecia aruna dohertyi Butler, 1901 (Sulu Archipelago)
Tanaecia aruna palawana Staudinger, 1889 (Pn)
Tanaecia aruna rudraca Fruhstorfer, 1913 (Bl)

genus: Cynitia

Cynitia cocytina (Horsfield) synonym Tanaecia cocytina (Horsfield, 1829)
Cynitia cocytina darani Fruhstorfer, 1913 (Jl)
Cynitia cocytina uposatha Fruhstorfer, 1898 (Bl)
Cynitia phlegethon (Semper, 1888) synonym Tanaecia godartii phlegethon (Semper, 1888) endemic
Cynitia phlegethon phlegethon (Semper, 1888) (Mi, Sr)
Cynitia phlegethon nirodha Fruhstorfer, 1898 (Bas)
Cynitia phlegethon visayana Schröder & Treadaway, 1981 (Le, Sr)
Cynitia godartii (G.R.Gray, 1846) synonym Tanaecia godartii (Gray, 1846)
Cynitia godartii dhayma Fruhstorfer, 1898 (Jl, Sb)
Cynitia semperi (Staudinger, 1889) synonym Tanaecia semperi (Staudinger, 1889) endemic
Cynitia semperi semperi (Staudinger, 1889) (Pn)
Cynitia semperi candida Schröder, Treadaway & Nuyda, 1990 (Cn)

genus: Euthalia

Euthalia monina (Fabricius, 1787)
Euthalia monina kayumanggia Treadaway & Nuyda, 1994 (Pn)
Euthalia monina suluana Fruhstorfer, 1902 (Sulu, Jl)
Euthalia tanagra Staudinger, 1889
Euthalia aconthea (Cramer, [1777])
Euthalia aconthea bongaoensis Schröder, Treadaway & Nuyda, 1990 (Bg, Sng, Twi)
Euthalia aconthea joloana Staudinger, 1889 (Jl)
Euthalia aconthea obatrata Yokochi, 1994 (Dumaran)
Euthalia aconthea palawana Staudinger, 1889 (Cn, Pn)
Euthalia aconthea sibutana Schröder, Treadaway & Nuyda, 1990 (Sb)
Euthalia alpheda (Godart, 1824)
Euthalia alpheda cusama Fruhstorfer, 1898 (Dt, Homonhon, Mi)
Euthalia alpheda leytana Schröder & Treadaway, 1982 (Le, Sr)
Euthalia alpheda liaoi Schröder & Treadaway, 1982 (N, Py)
Euthalia alpheda mindorensis Schröder & Treadaway, 1982 (Mo)
Euthalia alpheda phelada Semper, 1888 (Lz)
Euthalia alpheda rodriguezi Schröder & Treadaway, 1982 (Pn)
Euthalia alpheda sibuyana Schröder & Treadaway, 1982 (Sn, Romblon)
Euthalia alpheda soregina Fruhstorfer, 1898 (Sulu Archipelago, Jl)
Euthalia lusiada (C. Felder & R. Felder, 1863)
Euthalia lusiada lusiada (C. Felder & R. Felder, 1863) (Ba, Lz, Mq)
Euthalia lusiada malissia Fruhstorfer, 1898 (Bas, Dt, Homonhon, Le, Mi, Pnn, Sr)
Euthalia lusiada soloni M. Okano & T. Okano, 1990 (Bl)
Euthalia lusiada mindorana Fruhstorfer, 1899 (Me, Mo)
Euthalia lusiada schoenigi Schröder & Treadaway, 1978 (N)
Euthalia mindanaensis Schröder & Treadaway, 1978
Euthalia anosia (Moore, [1858])
Euthalia anosia tawitawia Treadaway & Nuyda, 1994 (Twi)
Euthalia mahadeva (Moore, 1859)
Euthalia mahadeva dacasini Hanafusa, 1990 (Bl)
Euthalia mahadeva ingae Schröder & Treadaway, 1990 (Bg, Sng, Sb, Twi)
Euthalia mahadeva rhamases Staudinger, 1889 (Cn, Pn)
Euthalia mahadeva yui Yockochi, 1994 (Dumaran)
Euthalia lubentina (Cramer, [1777])
Euthalia lubentina boholensis M. Okano & T. Okano, 1990 (Bl)
Euthalia lubentina goertzi Jumalon, 1975 (N, Pnn)
Euthalia lubentinaleytensis Jumalon, 1975 (Le, Sr)
Euthalia lubentina mindorana Tsukada, 1991 (Mo)
Euthalia lubentina tsukada Koçak, 1996
Euthalia lubentina nadenya Fruhstorfer, 1898 (Lz, Mq)
Euthalia lubentina philippensis Fruhstorfer, 1899 (Bas, Dt, Mi)
Euthalia djata Distant & Pryer, 1887
Euthalia djata ludonia Staudinger, 1889 (Pn)
Euthalia adonia (Cramer, [1779])
Euthalia adonia princesa Fruhstorfer, 1899 (Pn)

genus: Bassarona

Bassarona piratica (Semper, 1888) endemic
Bassarona piratica piratica (Semper, 1888) (Camiguin de Mi, Mi, Lz, Mo)
Bassarona piratica dinagatensis Tsukada, 1991 (Dt)
Bassarona piratica negrosiana Schröder & Treadaway, 1987 (N)
Bassarona piratica romeo Schröder & Treadaway, 1987 (northern Mi)
Bassarona piratica sarmana Fruhstorfer, 1898 (Bas)
Bassarona piratica subpiratica Schröder & Treadaway, 1987 (Lz)
Bassarona piratica medaga Fruhstorfer (Mi, Camiguin de Mi)
Bassarona dunya (Doubleday, [1848])
Bassarona dunya monara Fruhstorfer, 1898 (Pn)
Bassarona teuta (Doubleday, [1848])
Bassarona teuta balabacana Tsukada, 1991 (Bl)
Bassarona teuta eson de Nicéville, 1894 (Pn)

genus: Dophla

Dophla evelina (Stoll, 1790)
Dophla evelina albusequus Nihira & Kawamura, 1986 (Sng, Twi)
Dophla evelina balabacana Tsukada, 1991 (Bl)
Dophla evelina chloe Schröder & Treadaway, 1990 (Me, N, Py, Sn)
Dophla evelina circe Schröder & Treadaway, 1990 (Sb)
Dophla evelina eva Felder, 1867 (Ba, Catanduanes, Lz, Mq, Mo)
Dophla evelina proditrix Fruhstorfer, 1898 (Bas, Biliran, Bl, Camiguin de Mi, Dt, Le, Mi, Pnn)
Dophla evelina samarensis Tsukada, 1991 (Sr)
Dophla evelina tyawena Fruhstorfer, 1898 (Cn, Pn)

genus: Lexias

Lexias hikarugenzi Tsukada & Nishiyama, 1980
Lexias damalis Erichson, 1834
Lexias damalis damalis Erichson, 1834 (Ba, Lz)
Lexias damalis antiquea Schröder & Treadaway, 1980 (western Py)
Lexias damalis galoa Fruhstorfer, 1898 (Mo)
Lexias pardalis (Moore, 1878)
Lexias pardalis cavarna Fruhstorfer, 1898 (Bl)
Lexias pardalis ellora Fruhstorfer, 1890 (Mo)
Lexias pardalis tethys Tsukada, 1991 (Pn)
Lexias dirtea (Fabricius, 1793)
Lexias dirtea palawana Moore, 1897 (Cn, Pn)
Lexias canescens (Butler, [1869])
Lexias canescens leopardina Fruhstorfer, 1898 (Sulu Archipelago, Jl)
Lexias satrapes C. Felder & R. Felder, 1861
Lexias satrapes satrapes C. Felder & R. Felder, 1861 (Lz, Mo, Polillo)
Lexias satrapes amlana Jumalon, 1970 (Me, N, western Py)
Lexias satrapes hiwaga Nuyda & Kawamura, 1989 (Camiguin de Lz)
Lexias satrapes ormocana Jumalon, 1970 (Le, Sr)
Lexias satrapes ornata Schröder & Treadaway, 1979 (Sn)
Lexias satrapes trapesa Semper, 1888 (Mi)
Lexias panopus C. Felder & R. Felder, 1861
Lexias panopus ingae Schröder & Treadaway, 1987 (N, Py)
Lexias panopus miscus Fruhstorfer, 1898 (Mi)
Lexias panopus visayana Schröder & Treadaway, 1987 (Bl, Le, Sr)
Lexias panopus vistrica Fruhstorfer, 1898 (Dt, Homonhon)

genus: Pantoporia

Pantoporia hordonia (Stoll, 1790)
Pantoporia hordonia doronia Staudinger (Cn, Pn)
Pantoporia epira C. Felder & R. Felder, 1863
Pantoporia epira epira C. Felder & R. Felder, 1863 (Burias)
Pantoporia epira heliobole Semper, 1878 (eastern & central Mi, Sr)
Pantoporia epira luzonensis Eliot, 1969 (northern Lz)
Pantoporia paraka (Butler, [1879])
Pantoporia paraka paraka (Butler, [1879]) (Sb)
Pantoporia paraka olanguana Tsukada & Kaneko, 1985 (Bl, Pn)
Pantoporia dama (Moore, 1858)
Pantoporia dama dama (Moore, 1858) (Catanduanes, Lz, Mq, Me, Mo, N, Py, Sb)
Pantoporia dama athene Staudinger, 1889 (Bl, Cn, Pn)
Pantoporia dama babuyanensis Tsukada & Kaneko, 1985 (Ba)
Pantoporia dama camotesiana Fruhstorfer, 1912 (Ca)
Pantoporia dama commixta Fruhstorfer, 1908 (Bl, Cu, Camiguin de Mi, Dt, Le, Mi, Pnn, Sr)
Pantoporia cyrilla (C. Felder & R. Felder, 1863)
Pantoporia cyrilla cyrilla (C. Felder & R. Felder, 1863) (Camiguin de Lz, Lz, Polillo)
Pantoporia cyrilla athenais C. Felder & R. Felder, 1863 (Bas, Bl, Cu, Ca, Dt, Homonhon, Jl, Le, Mi, Sr, Sarangani)
Pantoporia cyrilla attica Semper, 1889 (Camiguin de Mi, N, Siquijor)
Pantoporia cyrilla phrygia C. Felder & R. Felder, 1863 (Cn, Mo)
Pantoporia cyrilla shunichii (Tsukada & Kaneko, 1985 (Sng, Sb)
Pantoporia antara (Moore, 1858)
Pantoporia antara suluana Eliot (Sulu)

genus: Lasippa

Lasippa bella (Staudinger, 1889)
Lasippa pata (Moore, 1858)
Lasippa pata pata (Moore, 1858) (Lz, Mq)
Lasippa pata patalina ((Semper, 1892) (Mo)
Lasippa pata semperi (Moore, 1899) (Bl, Dt, Le, eastern Mi, Sr)
Lasippa illigerella (Staudinger, 1889)
Lasippa illigera (Eschscholtz, 1821)
Lasippa illigera illigera (Eschscholtz, 1821) (northern & central Lz, Polillo)
Lasippa illigera alabatana Fruhstorfer, 1908 (Alabat, southern Lz, Mq)
Lasippa illigera calayana Fruhstorfer, 1908 (Ba)
Lasippa illigera hegesias Fruhstorfer, 1912 (Gu, N, Py)
Lasippa illigera pia Fruhstorfer, 1908 (Bas)
Lasippa illigera sibuyana Tsukada & Kaneko, 1985 (Sn)
Lasippa ebusa (C. Felder & R. Felder, 1863)
Lasippa ebusa ebusa (C. Felder & R. Felder, 1863) (Mo)
Lasippa ebusa euphemia Fruhstorfer, 1908 (Jl, Sng, Twi)
Lasippa ebusa laetitia Fruhstorfer, 1908 (Bas, Bl, Camiguin de Mi, Cu, Dt, Homonhon, Letye, Mi, Sr)
Lasippa pizarrasi M. Okano & T. Okano, 1986
Lasippa monata (Weyenbergh, 1874)
Lasippa monata sibutuana Tsukada & Kaneko, 1985 (Sb)

genus: Neptis
Neptis hylas (Linnaeus, 1758)
Neptis hylas sopatra Fruhstorfer, 1907 (Bg, Jl, Sng, Si, Sb, Twi)
Neptis duryodana Moore, 1858
Neptis duryodana emesa Fruhstorfer, 1908 (Cagayan Sulu, Cy, Pn)
Neptis duryodana mindorica Murayama, 1983 (Mo)
Neptis cymela C. Felder & R. Felder, 1863
Neptis cymela cymela C. Felder & R. Felder, 1863 (Ba, Lz, Mq, Me, N, Py, Pnn, Polillo, Sn)
Neptis cymela carvinus Fruhstorfer, 1908 (Camiguin de Mi)
Neptis cymela gatanga Fruhstorfer, 1908 (Jl, Sng, Twi)
Neptis cymela nitetis Hewitson, 1868 (Dt, Le, Mi, Sr)
Neptis cymela ormiscus Fruhstorfer 1908 (Bl, Cu)
Neptis cymela prodymus Fruhstorfer, 1908 (Bas)
Neptis cymela samiola Fruhstorfer, 1908 (Mo)
Neptis sunica Eliot, 1969
Neptis pampanga C. Felder & R. Felder, 1863
Neptis pampanga pampanga C. Felder & R. Felder, 1863 (Lz, Mq)
Neptis pampanga boholica Moore, 1899 (Bl, Cu, Le, Mi, Sr)
Neptis pampanga dormida Eliot, 1969 (Mo)
Neptis pampanga lizana Fruhstorfer, 1900 (Bas)
Neptis pampanga myleenae Tsukada & Kaneko, 1985 (N, western Py)
Neptis clinia Moore, 1872
Neptis clinia parthica Fruhstorfer, 1908 (Cy, Dumaran, Pn)
Neptis clinia solygeia Fruhstorfer, 1908 (Jl, Sb)
Neptis mindorana C. Felder & R. Felder, 1863
Neptis mindorana mindorana C. Felder & R. Felder, 1863 (Cy, Mq, Mo)
Neptis mindorana harpasa Fruhstorfer, 1912 (Bl, Cn, Dumaran, Pn)
Neptis mindorana ilocana C. Felder & R. Felder, 1863 (Ca, Gu, Lz, N, Py, Polillo, Sn, Siquijor)
Neptis mindorana nosba Fruhstorfer, 1912 (Bl, Cu, Ca, Dt, Le, Pnn, Sr)
Neptis mindorana pseudosoma Moore, 1899 (Bas, Camiguin de Mi, Jl, Mi, Siargao)
Neptis mindorana palibothra Fruhstorfer (Bas)
Neptis felisimilis Schröder & Treadaway, 1983
Neptis harita Moore, [1875]
Neptis harita palawanica Staudinger, 1889 (Pn)
Neptis harita calamiana Schröder & Treadaway, 1995 (Cn)
Neptis omeroda Moore, 1874
Neptis omeroda omeroda Moore, 1874 (Sb)
Neptis omeroda occultus Tsukada & Kaneko, 1985 (Bl, Pn)
Neptis cyra C. Felder & R. Felder, 1863
Neptis cyra cyra C. Felder & R. Felder, 1863 (Lz)
Neptis cyra canlaona Murayama, 1983 (N, Pnn)
Neptis cyra elioti Jumalon, 1975 (Cu)
Neptis cyra vibusa Semper, 1889 (Bl, Dt, Le, Mi, Sr)
Neptis anjana Moore, 1881
Neptis anjana vidua Staudinger, 1889 (Pn)

genus: Phaedyma

Phaedyma columella (Cramer, [1780])
Phaedyma columella angara Semper, 1889 (Camiguin de Mi)
Phaedyma columella eremita C. Felder & R. Felder, 1867 (Bl, Catanduanes, Cu, Gu, Lz, Mq, Me, N, Pnn, Romblon, Sn)
Phaedyma columella eumenaia Fruhstorfer, 1912 (Mo)
Phaedyma columella mesogaia Fruhstorfer, 1912 (Le, Mi, Sr)
Phaedyma columella ophianella Staudinger, 1889 (Bl, Cn, Pn)
Phaedyma columella soror Semper, 1889 (Ca)
genus: Dichorragia

Dichorragia nesimachus (Doyère, [1840])
Dichorragia nesimachus kawamurai Nihira, 1982 (N, Py)
Dichorragia nesimachus leytensis Shimagami, 1990 (Le, Pnn)
Dichorragia nesimachus luzonensis Shimagami, 1990 (Lz, Mo)
Dichorragia nesimachus machates Fruhstorfer, 1898 (Pn)
Dichorragia nesimachus pesistratus Fruhstorfer, 1898 (Mi)
Dichorragia nesimachus samarensis Tsukada, 1991 (northern Sr)

genus: Rohana

Rohana parisatis (Westwood, [1850])
Rohana parisatis nana Staudinger, 1889 (Pn)
Rohana rhea (C. Felder & R. Felder, 1863)
Rohana rhea rhea (C. Felder & R. Felder, 1863) (Lz, Mq, Ba)
Rohana rhea babuyana Tsukada, 1991 (Camiguin de Lz)
Rohana rhea danae Fruhstorfer, 1906 (Biliran, Bl, Le, Mi, Pnn, Sr)
Rohana rhea dinagatana Tsukada, 1991 (Dt)
Rohana rhea mindora Fruhstorfer, 1906 (Mo, [Bohol, Le, Siargao (D'A)]
Rohana rhea negrosa Tsukada, 1991 (Cu, N, Py)
Rohana rhea rana Staudinger, 1889 (Pn)
Rohana rhea suluana Tsukada, 1991 (Bg, Sng, Sb, Tawitawi)

genus: Helcyra

Helcyra miyazakii Tsukada, 1991

genus: Hestinalis

Hestinalis dissimilis (Hall, 1935)
Hestinalis waterstradti (Watkins, 1928)
Hestinalis waterstradti waterstradti (Watkins, 1928) (southern Mi)
Hestinalis waterstradti borealis Tsukada, 1991 (northern Mi)

genus: Euripus

Euripus nyctelius (Doubleday, 1845)
Euripus nyctelius clytia C. Felder & R. Felder, 1867 (Lz)
Euripus nyctelius marinduquanus Treadaway, 1995 (Mq)
Euripus nyctelius nysia Semper, 1887 (Bl, Camiguin de Mi, Le, Mi, Sr)
Euripus nyctelius ophelion Fruhstorfer, 1914 (Bl)
Euripus nyctelius orestheion Fruhstorfer, 1914 (Mo)
Euripus nyctelius palawanicus Fruhstorfer, 1899 (Pn)
Euripus nyctelius sparsus Tsukada, 1991 (N, Py)

genus: Polyura

Polyura athamas (Drury, [1773])
Polyura athamas kotakaii Hanafusa, 1989 (Camiguin de Lz)
Polyura athamas acuta Rothschild, 1899 (P excluding Bl, Bg, Cn, Camiguin de Lz, Pn, Sng, Sb, Twi, Lz, Mo, Bl, Mi)
Polyura athamas angustior Schröder & Treadaway, 1990
Polyura athamas palawanica Rothschild, 1899 (Cn, Pn)
Polyura athamas uraeus Rothschild, 1899 (Bl)
Polyura moori (Distant, [1883])
Polyura moori galeoni Schröder & Treadaway, 1990 (Sng, Twi)
Polyura delphis (Doubleday, 1843)
Polyura schreiber (Godart, [1824])
Polyura schreiber bilarensis Jumalon, 1975 (Bl, Le, Pnn, Sr)
Polyura schreiber delicatus Tsukada, 1991 (Dt)
Polyura schreiber luzonica Rothschild, 1899 (Lz, Mq, Mo, Batanes)
Polyura schreiber mizunumai Sato & Hanafusa, 1987 (Me, N)
Polyura schreiber praedicta Schröder & Treadaway, 1980 (Pn)
Polyura schreiber toshikoe Sato & Nishiyama, 1987 (Mi)

genus: Charaxes

Charaxes solon (Fabricius, 1793)
Charaxes solon lampedo (Hübner, [1824]) (Cu, Lz, Mq, Mo, N, Py, Sn)
Charaxes solon orchomenus Fruhstorfer, 1914 (Bl, Cn, Pn)
Charaxes solon shohgun Tsukada, 1991 (Bl, Dt, Le, Mi, Pnn, Sr)
Charaxes solon tindongani Schröder & Treadaway, 1989 (Sng, Sb, Twi)
Charaxes bajula Staudinger, 1889
Charaxes bajula bajula Staudinger, 1889 (Bl, Cn, Pn)
Charaxes bajula adoracion Schröder & Treadaway, 1989 (Camiguin de Lz, Lz)
Charaxes bajula basilisae Schröder & Treadaway, 1982 (Cu, Py
Charaxes bajula lanitus Tsukada, 1991 (Dt, eastern Mi)
Charaxes bajula remulus Tsukada, 1991 (Mq)
Charaxes amycus C. Felder & R. Felder, 1861
Charaxes amycus amycus C. Felder & R. Felder, 1861 (Lz, Polillo)
Charaxes amycus basilium Tsukada, 1991 (Dt)
Charaxes amycus bayanii Schröder & Treadaway, 1982 (Mq, N)
Charaxes amycus boholensis Tsukada, 1991 (Bl)
Charaxes amycus carolus Rothschild, 1900 (Mi, Camiguin de Mi)
Charaxes amycus georgius Staudinger, 1892 (Mo)
Charaxes amycus leonido Tsukada, 1991 (northern Sr)
Charaxes amycus leytensis M. Okano & T. Okano, 1986 (Biliran, Le, Pnn)
Charaxes amycus marion Schröder & Treadaway, 1981 (Sn, Romblon group)
Charaxes amycus negrosensis Schröder & Treadaway, 1982 (N)
Charaxes amycus shunichii Hanafusa, 1982 (Camiguin de Lz)
Charaxes amycus theobaldo Schröder & Treadaway, 1982 (Me, western Py)
Charaxes amycus myron Fruhstorfer (Polillo, Gu)
Charaxes antonius Semper, 1878
Charaxes antonius antonius Semper, 1878 (Mi)
Charaxes antonius dinagatensis Tsukada, 1991 (Dt)
Charaxes antonius osadai Hanafusa, 1985 (Bl, Le, Pnn, Sr)
Charaxes sangana Schröder & Treadaway, 1988
Charaxes sangana sangana Schröder & Treadaway, 1988 (Sng, Twi)
Charaxes sangana juwaki Schröder & Treadaway, 1988 (Sb)
Charaxes plateni Staudinger, 1889
Charaxes plateni plateni Staudinger, 1889 (Bl, Pn)
Charaxes plateni latifascia Schröder, Treadaway & Nuyda, 1991 (Cn)
Charaxes bupalus Staudinger, 1889
Charaxes bupalus bupalus Staudinger, 1889 (Pn)
Charaxes bupalus rowelii Schröder & Treadaway, 1993 (Bl)
Charaxes harmodius C. Felder & R. Felder, [1867]
Charaxes harmodius harpagon Staudinger, 1889 (Cn, Pn)

genus: Prothoe

Prothoe franck (Godart, [1824])
Prothoe semperi Honrath, 1884
Prothoe semperi semperi Honrath, 1884 (Le, central & western Mi, Pnn)
Prothoe semperi boholensis M. Okano & T. Okano, 1989 (Bl)
Prothoe semperi gregalis Tsukada, 1991 (eastern Mi)
Prothoe semperi samarensis Tsukada, 1991 (northern Sr)
Prothoe plateni Semper, 1892

genus: Agatasa

Agatasa chrysodonia Staudinger, 1890
Agatasa chrysodonia chrysodonia Staudinger, 1890 (Mi)
Agatasa chrysodonia heterodonia Semper, 1892 (Mo)
Agatasa chrysodonia luzonensis Schröder & Treadaway, 1988 (Lz)
Agatasa chrysodonia mahasthama Fruhstorfer (Pn)

genus: Faunis

Faunis phaon (Erichson, 1834)
Faunis phaon phaon (Erichson, 1834) (Ba, northern & central Lz, Mq, Polillo)
Faunis phaon pan Schröder & Treadaway, 2003 (central & south Lz)
Faunis phaon carfinia Fruhstorfer, 1911 (Gu, southern Lz, Me, N, Py)
Faunis phaon leucis C. Felder & R. Felder, 1861 (Bas, Mi)
Faunis phaon lurida C. Felder & R. Felder, [1867] (Mo)
Faunis phaon sibuyanensis Aoki & Uémura, 1982 (Sn, Romblon)
Faunis phaon iconion Fruhstorfer
Faunis stomphax Westwood, 1858
Faunis stomphax plateni Staudinger, 1889 (Pn)
Faunis sappho Semper, 1878
Faunis sappho sappho Semper, 1878 (Bl)
Faunis sappho ameinokleia Fruhstorfer, 1911 (Camiguin de Mi)
Faunis sappho dinagatensis Aoki & Uémura, 1982 (Dt)
Faunis sappho kleis Semper, 1878 (Ca, Le, Pnn, Sr, Siargao)

genus: Taenaris

Taenaris horsfieldi (Swainson, [1820])
Taenaris horsfieldi plateni Staudinger, 1889 (Pn)

genus: Discophora

Discophora sondaica (Boisduval, 1836)
Discophora sondaica semperi Moore, 1895 (eastern & central Mi)
Discophora sondaica camdao Schröder & Treadaway, 1995 (Camiguin de Mi)
Discophora sondaica samarana Schröder & Treadaway, 1995 (Sr)
Discophora simplex Staudinger, 1889
Discophora simplex simplex Staudinger, 1889 (Cn, Pn)
Discophora necho C. Felder & R. Felder, [1867]
Discophora necho confluens Schröder & Treadaway, 1989 (Sb)
Discophora necho erasimus Fruhstorfer, 1911 (Jl, Sng, Twi)
Discophora necho guyi Treadaway & Nuyda, 1994 (Sn)
Discophora necho mariebellae Nihira, Nuyda & Kitamura, 1994 (Py)
Discophora necho mindorana Fruhstorfer, 1911 (Mq, Mo
Discophora necho odora Fruhstorfer, 1900 (Cn, Pn)
Discophora necho sahi Treadaway & Nuyda, 1994 (Bl)
Discophora philippina Moore, 1895
Discophora ogina (Godart, [1824])
Discophora ogina ogina (Godart, [1824]) (Lz, Mq, Mi, Polillo)
Discophora ogina pulchra Nihira, 1987 (Me, N, Py)
Discophora dodong Schröder & Treadaway, 1981

genus: Amathusia

Amathusia phidippus (Linnaeus, 1758)
Amathusia phidippus phidippus (Linnaeus, 1758) (Ba, northern & central Lz, Mq, Polillo)
Amathusia phidippus cebuensis (M. Okano & T. Okano, 1986 (Cu)
Amathusia phidippus negrosensis (M. Okano & T. Okano, 1986 (Me, N, Py, Sn)
Amathusia phidippus pollicaris Butler, 1870 (P excluding Bg, Cu, Me, N, Py, Sng, Sb, Sn, Twi)
Amathusia phidippus palawana Fruhstorfer (Pn)

genus:Amathuxidia

Amathuxidia amythaon (Doubleday, 1847)
Amathuxidia amythaon negrosensis Schröder & Treadaway, 1980 (N)
Amathuxidia amythaon perinthas Fruhstorfer, 1911 (Mi)
Amathuxidia amythaon philippina Moore, 1895 (Le, Pnn, Sr)

genus: Zeuxidia

Zeuxidia semperi C. Felder & R. Felder, 1861
Zeuxidia semperi semperi C. Felder & R. Felder, 1861 (Lz, Polillo)
Zeuxidia semperi excelsa Rothschild, 1916 (N)
Zeuxidia semperi therionarca Fruhstorfer, 1911 (Mo)
Zeuxidia sibulana Honrath, 1884
Zeuxidia sibulana sibulana Honrath, 1884 (eastern & southern Mi)
Zeuxidia sibulana medicieloi Schröder, 1977 (Le, Sr)
Zeuxidia amethystus Butler, 1865
Zeuxidia amethystus amethystina Stichel, 1906 (Camiguin de Mi, Mi)
Zeuxidia amethystus tawiensis (Schröder & Treadaway, 1991 (Sng, Twi)
Zeuxidia amethystus victrix Staudinger, 1889 (Bl, Pn)

genus: Melanitis

Melanitis leda (Linnaeus, 1758)
Melanitis atrax (C. Felder & R. Felder, 1863)
Melanitis atrax atrax (C. Felder & R. Felder, 1863) (Alabat, Ba, Burias, Lz, Mq, Polillo, Sn)
Melanitis atrax bazilana Fruhstorfer, 1908 (Bas)
Melanitis atrax cajetana Semper, 1886 (Bl, Cu, Ca, Le, Sr)
Melanitis atrax elya Fruhstorfer, 1911 (D'A gives spelling as clya) (Jl, Sng, Sb, Twi)
Melanitis atrax erichsonia C. Felder & R. Felder, 1863 (Mo)
Melanitis atrax lucillus Fruhstorfer, 1908 (Camiguin de Mi, Dt, Mi)
Melanitis atrax soloni M. Okano & T. Okano, 1991 (Me, N, Py)
Melanitis zitenius (Herbst, 1796)
Melanitis zitenius xantophthalmus Staudinger, 1889 (Pn)
Melanitis boisduvalia (C. Felder & R. Felder, 1863)
Melanitis boisduvalia boisduvalia (C. Felder & R. Felder, 1863) (P excluding Bl, Bas, Pn, Sulu Archipelago, Lz)
Melanitis boisduvalia palawanica Fruhstorfer, 1908 (Bl, Pn)
Melanitis boisduvalia pompeja Fruhstorfer, 1911 (Bas)
Melanitis boisduvalia carales Fruhstorfer (Mo)
Melanitis boisduvalia ernita Fruhstorfer (Mi, Bohol)
Melanitis phedima (Cramer, [1780])
Melanitis phedima nuwara Fruhstorfer (Lz, Mo)

genus: Elymnias

Elymnias nesaea (Linnaeus, 1764)
Elymnias nesaea tawicola Schröder & Treadaway, 1989 (Bg, Sng, Sb, Twi)
Elymnias congruens Semper, 1887
Elymnias congruens congruens Semper, 1887 (Biliran, Catanduanes, Le, Pnn, Sr)
Elymnias congruens endida Fruhstorfer, 1911 (Bl)
Elymnias congruens jekei Schröder & Treadaway, 1989 (central & northern Lz)
Elymnias congruens phaios Fruhstorfer, 1907 (southern Mi)
Elymnias congruens photinus Fruhstorfer, 1907 (northern Mi)
Elymnias congruens rafaela Fruhstorfer, 1907 (Bas)
Elymnias congruens salipi Schröder & Treadaway, 1989 (Sng, Twi)
Elymnias congruens subcongruens Semper, 1892 (southern Lz, Mq, Mo)
Elymnias congruens neergaardorum Schröder & Treadaway, 2003 (Me)
Elymnias panthera (Fabricius, 1787)
Elymnias panthera suluana Fruhstorfer, 1899 (Cagayan Sulu)
Elymnias parce Staudinger, 1889
Elymnias parce parce Staudinger, 1889 (Bl, Cn, Dumaran, southern Mo, Pn)
Elymnias parce justini Schröder & Treadaway, 2003 (Busuanga)
Elymnias dara Distant & Pryer, 1887
Elymnias dara albofasciata Staudinger, 1889 (Bl, Dumaran, Pn)
Elymnias sansoni Jumalon, 1975
Elymnias luteofasciata Okubo, 1980
Elymnias melias C. Felder & R. Felder, 1863
Elymnias melias melias C. Felder & R. Felder, 1863 (Burias, central & southern Lz, Polillo)
Elymnias melias malis Semper, 1887 (northern Lz, Polillo)
Elymnias beza Hewitson, 1877
Elymnias beza beza Hewitson, 1877 (Mi)
Elymnias beza samarana Schröder & Treadaway, 1980 (Le, Sr)
Elymnias koch Semper, 1887
Elymnias casiphonides Semper, 1892
Elymnias casiphonides casiphonides Semper, 1892 (Mi)
Elymnias casiphonides sanrafaela Schröder & Treadaway, 1980 (northern Sr)
Elymnias kanekoi Tsukada & Nishiyama, 1980
Elymnias esaca (Westwood, [1851])
Elymnias esaca egialina (C. Felder & R. Felder, 1863) (Ba, north eastern Lz, Mq, northern Mo, Nehros, Py)
Elymnias esaca georgi Fruhstorfer, 1907 (Mi)
Elymnias esaca andrewi Schröder & Treadaway, 2003 (Le, Sr)

genus: Neorina

Neorina lowii (Doubleday, [1849])
Neorina lowii princesa Staudinger, 1889 (Bl, Pn)

genus: Zethera

Zethera hestioides C. Felder & R. Felder, 1861
Zethera pimplea (Erichson, 1834)
Zethera pimplea pimplea (Erichson, 1834) (Ba, Burias, Camiguin de Lz, Lz, Mq, Mo, Polillo)
Zethera pimplea diloris Fruhstorfer
Zethera musa C. Felder & R. Felder, 1861
Zethera musides Semper, 1878
Zethera thermaea Hewitson, 1877

genus: Zophoessa

Zophoessa dataensis Semper, 1887

genus: Lethe

Lethe europa (Fabricius, 1775)
Lethe chandica (Moore, [1858])
Lethe mekara (Moore, [1858])

genus: Ptychandra

Ptychandra lorquinii C. Felder & R. Felder, 1861
Ptychandra ohtanii Hayashi, 1978
Ptychandra schadenbergi Semper, 1887
Ptychandra mindorana Semper, 1892
Ptychandra leucogyne C. Felder & R. Felder, [1867]
Ptychandra negrosensis Banks, Holloway & Barlow, 1976
Ptychandra negrosensis angelalcalai Badon & Nuyda, 2020

genus: Orsotriaena

Orsotriaena medus (Fabricius, 1775)

genus: Mycalesis

Mycalesis ita C. Felder & R. Felder, 1863
Mycalesis kashiwaii Aoki & Uémura, 1982
Mycalesis georgi Aoki & Uémura, 1982
Mycalesis felderi Butler, 1868
Mycalesis kurosawai Kashiwai, 1986
Mycalesis teatus Fruhstorfer, 1911
Mycalesis treadawayi Schröder, 1986
Mycalesis tagala C. Felder & R. Felder, 1863
Mycalesis bisaya C. Felder & R. Felder, 1863
Mycalesis janardana Moore, [1858]
Mycalesis perseus (Fabricius, 1775)
Mycalesis mineus (Linnaeus, 1758)
Mycalesis horsfieldi (Moore, [1892])
Mycalesis igoleta C. Felder & R. Felder, 1863
Mycalesis frederici Aoki & Uémura, 1982
Mycalesis tamarau Aoki & Uémura, 1982
Mycalesis orseis Hewitson, [1864]
Mycalesis aramis Hewitson, 1866

Lycaenidae
genus: Cyaniriodes
Cyaniriodes libna (Hewitson, 1869)
C. l. miotskushi Hayashi, 1976 (Pn)
C. l. samarana Schröder & Treadaway, 1994 (Sr)
C. l. tawicolana Schröder & Treadaway, 1994 (Twi)
Cyaniriodes siraspiorum Schröder & Treadaway, 1976
genus: Poritia
Poritia philota Hewitson, 1874
P. p. glennuydai Schröder & Treadaway, 1989 (central & western Lz)
P. p. mindora Osada, 1994 (Mo)
P. p. phare H. H. Druce, 1895 (Bl, Dt, Le, Mi, N, Pnn, Sr)
Poritia talophi Hayashi,
Poritia erycinoides (C. Felder & R. Felder, [1865])
P. e kinoshitai Hayashi, 1976 (Pn)
Poritia hewitsoni Moore, [1866]
P. h. solitaria Schröder & Treadaway, 1989 (central Lz)
Poritia phama H. H. Druce, 1895
P. p. palawana Osada, 1994 (Pn)
Poritia plateni Staudinger, 1889
Poritia languana Schröder & Treadaway, 1986
genus: Simiskina
Simiskina phalena (Hewitson, 1874)
S. p. hayashii Schröder & Treadaway, 1979 (Bl, Le, Mi)
S. p. ilagana Osada & Hashimoto, 1987 (north-eastern Mi)
S. p. howarthi Hayashi, 1976 (Pn)
Simiskina phalia (Hewitson, 1874)
S. p. morishitai Hayashi, 1976 (southern Pn)
Simiskina pasira Moulton 1911
S. p. pasira Moulton, 1911 (Pn)
S. p. semperi Fruhstorfer, 1919 (Camiguin de Mi)
genus: Poriskina
Poriskina phakos H. H. Druce, 1895
genus: Deramas
Deramas bidotata Fruhstorfer, 1914
Deramas evelynae Schröder & Treadaway, 1978
D. e. evelynae Schröder & Treadaway, 1978 (southern Lz, Mq)
D. e. nahomiae Takanami, 1985 (northern N)
D. e. tsuio Takanami, 1987 (Mo)
Deramas ikedai Hayashi, 1978
Deramas mindanensis Eliot, 1964
Deramas nelvis Eliot, 1964
D. n. manobo Schröder & Treadaway, 1978 (southern Mi (Mt. Apo))
D. n. montana Schröder & Treadaway, 1978 (northern Mi (Mt. Kitanlad)
Deramas sumikat Schröder & Treadaway, 1986
Deramas tomokoae Hayashi, 1981
Deramas toshikoae Hayashi, 1981
Deramas treadawayi Hayashi, 1981
Deramas talophi Hayashi,
genus: Liphyra
Liphyra brassolis Westwood, 1864
L. b. hermelnuydae Schröder & Treadaway, 1988 (Homonhon)
L. b. justini Schröder & Treadaway, 1988 (eastern Lz)
genus: Allotinus
Allotinus fallax C. Felder & R. Felder, [1865]
A. f. fallax C. Felder & R. Felder, [1865] (Bl, Cu, Le, Lz, Mq, Me, Mo, Py, Sr, Sn)
A. f. aphacus Fruhstorfer, 1898 (Camiguin de Mi, Dt, Homonhon, Mi, Pnn)
A. f. eryximachus Fruhstorfer, 1898 (Mo)
A. f. dotion Fruhstorfer, 1898 (Bas)
A. f. tymphrestus Fruhstorfer, 1916 (Jl, Sb, Twi)
Allotinus subviolaceus C. Felder & R. Felder, [1865]
Allotinus punctatus Semper, 1889
Allotinus nigritus Semper, 1889
Allotinus kudratus Takanami, 1990
Allotinus sarrastes Fruhstorfer, 1898
Allotinus melos H. H. Druce, 1896
Allotinus samarensis Eliot, 1986
A. s. samarensis Eliot, 1986 (Le, Mi, Sr)
Allotinus luzonensis Eliot, 1987
Allotinus albatus C. & R. Felder, [1865]
A. a. mendax Eliot, 1986 (Lz, Mq, Sr)
Allotinus apries Fruhstorfer, 1913
A. a. ristus Eliot, 1986 (Pn)
Allotinus corbeti Eliot, 1956
Allotinus unicolor C. Felder & R. Felder, [1865]
A. u. georgius Fruhstorfer, 1898 (Bl, Mo, Sng, Twi)
Allotinus nivalis (H. Druce, 1873)
A. n. felderi Semper, 1889 (Homonhon, Le, Lz, Mq, Mi, N, Sr, Sn, Twi)
Allotinus substrigosus (Moore, 1884)
A. s. ballantinei Eliot, 1986 (Pn)
A. s. yusukei Eliot, 1986 (Mi)
genus: Logania
Logania malayica Distant, 1884
L. m. subura Fruhstorfer, 1914 (Le, Mi, Sr)
Logania waltraudae Eliot, 1986
Logania regina (H. Druce, 1873)
L. r. evora Fruhstorfer, 1916 (Sng, Twi)
Logania marmorata Moore, 1884
L. m. faustina Fruhstorfer, 1914 (Jl, Le, Mi, Sr, Twi)
L. m. hilaeira Fruhstorfer, 1914 (Cagayan Sulu)
L. m. palawana Fruhstorfer, 1914 (Bl, Cn, Lz, Mq, Pn)
L. m. samosata Fruhstorfer, 1914 (Cu, Mo)
Logania distanti Semper, 1889
L. d. distanti Semper, 1889 (Cu, Lz, Mi, N, Sr)
L. d. drucei Moulton, 1911 (Bl)
genus: Lontalius
Lontalius eltus Eliot, 1986
L. e. treadawayi Eliot, 1986
genus: Miletus
Miletus gopara (de Nicéville, 1890)
M. g. eustatius Fruhstorfer, 1898 (Sng, Sb, Twi)
Miletus symethus (Cramer, [1777])
M. s. edonus Fruhstorfer, 1898 (Pn)
M. s. hierophantes Fruhstorfer, 1916 (Jl, Mi, Twi)
M. s. phantus Eliot, 1986 (Lz, Mq)
M. s. philopator Fruhstorfer, 1914 (Mo)
Miletus atimonicus Murayama & Okamura, 1973
Miletus melanion C. Felder & R. Felder, [1865]
M. m. melanion C. Felder & R. Felder, [1865] (Lz, Mi, N, Pn)
M. m. euphranor Fruhstorfer, 1914 (Le, Mo)
Miletus bazilanus Fruhstorfer, 1898
Miletus takanamii Eliot, 1986
Miletus drucei Semper, 1889
M. d. drucei Semper, 1889 (Bl, Bl, Cu, Lz, Mo, Pn, Sr)
genus: Spalgis
Spalgis epius (Westwood, [1851])
S. e. semperi Fruhstorfer, 1923
S. e. strigatus Semper, 1889
Spalgis takanamii Eliot, 1984
genus: Curetis
Curetis nesophila (C. Felder & R. Felder, 1862)
Curetis tagalica (C. Felder & R. Felder, 1862)
C. t. tagalica (C. Felder & R. Felder, 1862) (P excluding Bl, Dumaran, Pn, Sb)
C. t. takanamii Schröder & Treadaway, 1979
C. t. palawanica Staudinger, 1889 (Bl, Dumaran, Pn)
genus: Anthene
Anthene emolus (Godart, [1824])
A. m. modesta Staudinger, 1889 (Lz, Pn)
Anthene licates (Hewitson, 1874)
A. l. addend Fruhstorfer, 1916 (Sanga, Sanga, Pn)
Anthene lycaenina (R. Felder, 1868)
A. l. miya Fruhstorfer, 1916 (Pn)
A. l. villosina Fruhstorfer, 1923 (Lz, Mo, Mi)
genus: Niphanda
Niphanda tessellata Moore, [1875]
N. t. aristarcha Fruhstorfer, 1919 (Lz, Mq, Mi, Sng)
genus: Una
Una philippensis Schröder & Treadaway, 1979
genus: Nacaduba
Nacaduba sericina (C. Felder & R. Felder, [1865])
N. s. sericina (C. Felder & R. Felder, [1865]) (Ba, Le, Lz, Mq, Me, Mo, N, Py, Polillo, Sr, Sn)
N. s. palawana Hayashi, 1977 (Pn)
N. s. thaumas Fruhstorfer, 1916 (Bas, Bg, Mi, Sng, Twi)
Nacaduba angusta (H. Druce, 1873)
N. a. angusta (H. Druce, 1873) (Pn)
N. a. limbura Fruhstorfer, 1916 (P excluding Pn)
N. a. thespia Fruhstorfer (Sulu)
Nacaduba pactolus (C. Felder, 1860)
N. p. neaira Fruhstorfer, 1916 (Bas, Bl, Lz, Mi, Pn, Pnn, Sr, Twi)
Nacaduba pavana (Horsfield, [1828])
N. p. asaga Fruhstorfer, 1916
N. p. georgi Fruhstorfer, 1916 (Le, Mi, Sr)
Nacaduba hermus (C. Felder, 1860)
N. h. tairea Fruhstorfer, 1916 (Bas, Mq, Mi)
Nacaduba sanaya Fruhstorfer, 1916
N. s. elioti Corbet, 1938 (Twi)
N. s. metallica Fruhstorfer, 1916 (Cu, Le, Lz, Mi)
Nacaduba berenice (Herrich- Schäffer, 1869)
N. b. zygida Fruhstorfer, 1916 (Bas, Le, Lz, Mi, N, Pn, Twi)
Nacaduba kurava (Moore, [1858])
N. k. fujikoai Hayashi, 1976 (Lz, Mq, Mi, N, Pn)
Nacaduba beroe (C. Felder & R. Felder, [1865])
N. b. beroe (C. Felder & R. Felder, [1865]) (Le, Lz, Mq, Mi, N, Pn)
N. b. neon Fruhstorfer (Pn)
Nacaduba subperusia (Snellen, 1896)
N. s. paska Eliot, 1955 (Jl, Le, Lz, Mq, Mo, Mi, Pn, Sn, Sb)
genus: Prosotas
Prosotas aluta (H. Druce, 1873)
P. a. philiata Fruhstorfer, 1916 (Bas, Mq, Mi, Pn, Sr, Sng)
Prosotas maputi (Semper, 1889)
Prosotas gracilis (Röber, 1886)
P. g. donina Snellen, 1901 (Pn)
Prosotas nora (C. Felder, 1860)
P. n. semperi Fruhstorfer, 1916 (Bas, Le, Lz, Mq, Mo, Mi, N, Sr)
P. n. superdates Fruhstorfer, 1916 (Pn, Sb)
Prosotas dubiosa (Semper, [1879])
P. d. lumpura Corbet, 1938 (Lz, Mq, Mi, N)
P. d. subardates Piepers & Snellen, 1918 (Pn)
Prosotas nelides de Nicéville, 1895
genus: Ionolyce
Ionolyce helicon (C. Felder, 1860)
I. h. merguiana Moore, 1884 (Pn)
genus: Catopyrops
Catopyrops ancyra (C. Felder, 1860)
C. a. almora H. Druce, 1873 (Le, Lz, Mq, Mi, Pn, Sb)
genus: Petrelaea
Petrelaea dana (de Nicéville, [1884])
genus: Caleta
Caleta roxus (Godart, [1824])
C. r. angustior Staudinger, 1889 (Bg, Cn, Cu, Camiguin de Mi, Dt, Lz, Mq, Me, Mo, Mi, Pn, Py, Sng, Twi)
Caleta elna (Hewitson, [1876])
C. e. elvira Fruhstorfer, 1918 (Pn)
Caleta caleta (Hewitson, [1876])
C. c. argola Hewitson, 1876 (Bas, Le, Mi, Sr, Sulu Archipelago)
C. c. gerasa Fruhstorfer, 1918 (Camiguin de Mi)
genus: Discolampa
Discolampa ethion (Westwood, [1851])
D. e. negrosiana Murayama, 1983 (N, Mt. Canlaon)
D. e. ulysses Staudinger, 1889 (Le, Lz, Mq, Mo, Mi, N, Pn, Sng, Sn, Twi, Ticao)
genus: Danis
Danis schaeffera (Eschscholtz, 1821)
D. s. schaeffera (Eschscholtz, 1821) (Bl, Bl, Cu, Ca, Lz, Me, Mo, Mi, N, Pn, Sng, Sn, Twi, Ticao)
genus: Jamides
Jamides bochus (Stoll, 1782)
J. b. georgi Fruhstorfer, 1916 (Le, Mindanan, Sr)
J. b. herodicus Fruhstorfer, 1916 (Catanduanes, Cu, Lz, Me, Mo, N, Py, Sn)
J. b. nabonassar Fruhstorfer, 1916 (Bl, Cn, Pn, Twi)
Jamides celeno (Cramer, [1775])
J. c. optimus Rothschild, 1886 (Jl, Lz, Mo, Mi, Pn)
Jamides pura (Moore, 1886)
J. p. eordaea Fruhstorfer, 1916 (Bl, Pn, Sb, Twi)
Jamides philatus (Snellen, 1878)
J. p. amphyssina Staudinger, 1889 (central & southern P, Bas, Jl, Pn, Sb, Twi)
J. p. osias Röber, 1886 (Lz, Mq, Mo)
Jamides elpis (Godart, [1824])
J. e. phaliga Fruhstorfer, 1916 (Bas, Mi, Sr, Le)
J. e. pseudelpis Butler, 1879 (Bl, Pn)
J. e. gerra Fruhstorfer (Pn)
Jamides virgulatus H. H. Druce, 1895
Jamides alsietus Fruhstorfer, 1916
J. a. alsietus Fruhstorfer, 1916 (Bas, Mi, N)
J. a. camarines Takanami, 1990 (Lz)
J. a. sabatus Fruhstorfer, 1916 (Pn)
Jamides aratus (Stoll, [1781])
J. a. adana Druce, 1875 (Sb)
J. a. nausiphanes Fruhstorfer, 1916 (Bl, Pn)
Jamides cunilda Snellen, 1896
J. c. sekii Takanami, 1988 (Pn)
Jamides alecto (C. Felder, 1860)
J. a. kawazoei Hayashi, 1976) (Pn)
J. a. manilana Toxopeus, 1930) (Catanduanes, Cu, Le, Lz, Mq, Me, Mo, Mi, N, Py, Sr)
Jamides cyta (Boisduval, 1832)
J. c. natsumiae Hayashi, 1976 (Pn)
J. c. raddatzi Schröder & Treadaway, 1984 (Camiguin de Lz, Le, Lz, Mq, Mi, N, Py, Sr, Sng, Sn, Twi)
J. c. koenigswarteri Schröder, Treadaway & Nuyda, 1993 (Mo)
Jamides cleodus C. Felder & R. Felder, [1865]
J. c. cleodus C. Felder & R. Felder, [1865] (Lz, N, Sn)
J. c. itumunus Treadaway & Nuyda, 1995 (Homonhon)
J. c. manias Fruhstorfer, 1916 (Le, Mi, Sr)
J. c. potidalon Fruhstorfer, 1916 (Bas, Jl, Sng)
J. c. semperi Fruhstorfer, 1916 (Mo)
J. c. trichonis Fruhstorfer, 1916 (Bl, Pn)
Jamides schatzi Röber, 1886
J. s. jumaloni Hayashi, 1976 (Pn)
J. s. nakamotoi Hayashi, 1977 (Cu, Le, Lz, Mq, Me, south-eastern Mi, N, Py, Sn)
Jamides suidas C. Felder & R. Felder, [1865]
J. s. suidas C. Felder & R. Felder, [1865] (Ba, Bl, Le, Lz, Mq, Mo, Mi, Sn, Polillo)
Jamides aritai Hayashi, [1977]
J. a. aritai Hayashi, 1976 (Pn)
J. a. mindanensis Hayashi, 1977 (Lz, Masnate, Mi, N, Py)
Jamides callistus Röber, 1886
J. c. callistus Röber, 1886 (Lz, Mq, Sn)
J. c. amastris Fruhstorfer, 1916 (Le, Mi)
J. c. cleitus Fruhstorfer, 1916 (Bas)
J. c. mioae Hayashi, 1976 (Cn, Pn, Sb)
J. c. neaethus Fruhstorfer, 1916 (Mo, Pn)
genus: Catochrysops
Catochrysops strabo (Fabricius, 1793)
C. s. luzonensis Tite, 1959 (Bl, Bas, Bl, Dt, Dumaran, Jl, Le, Lz, Me, Mo, Mi, Pn, Py, Sr)
Catochrysops panormus (C. Felder, 1860)
C. p. exiguus Distant, 1886 (Bl, Mi, Pn, Sb, Twi)
genus: Lampides
Lampides boeticus (Linnaeus, 1767) (P generally)
genus: Leptotes
Leptotes plinius (Fabricius, 1793)
L. p. leopardus Schultze, 1910 (Le, Lz, Mi (Surigao, South Cotabato))
genus: Castalius
Castalius rosimon (Fabricius, 1775)
C. r. monrosi Semper, 1889 (Lz, Sr)
genus: Tarucus
Tarucus waterstradti H. H. Druce, 1895
T. w. simillimus Schröder & Treadaway, 1985 (Mi (Surigao))
genus: Zizeeria
Zizeeria karsandra (Moore, 1865) (Jl, Lz, Mi, Pn)
Pseudozizeeria maha Kollar, 1848
P. m. okinawana Matsumura, 1929 (northern Lz)
genus: Zizina
Zizina otis (Fabricius, 1787)
Z. o. otis (Fabricius, 1787) (Bl, Cebe, Jl, Le, Lz, Mi, Pn)
genus: Zizula
Zizula hylax (Fabricius, 1775) (Le, Lz, Mq, Pn, Sb, Twi, Mo, Py, probably P generally)
genus: Famegana
Famegana alsulus (Herrich-Schäffer, 1869) (Lz)
genus: Everes
Everes lacturnus (Godart, [1824])
E. l. lacturnus (Godart, [1824]) (Lz, Mi, Pn, Twi)
genus: Pithecops
Pithecops corvus Fruhstorfer, [1919]
P. c. corax Fruhstorfer (Bas, Bl, Le, Lz, Mq, Me, Mo, Mi, Pn, Py, Pnn, Sr, Sng, Sn)
genus: Neopithecops
Neopithecops zalmora (Butler, 1870)
N. z. zalmora (Butler, 1870) (Lz, Cu, Le, Lz, Pn)
Neopithecops iolanthe Eliot & Kawazoé, 1983
N. i. boholicus Eliot & Kawazoé, 1983 (Bl)
genus: Megisba
Megisba malaya (Horsfield, 1828)
M. m. sikkima Moore, 1884 (Bl, Le, Lz, Mq, Me, Mo, Mi, N, Pn, Py, Sr, Sn, Sb, Twi)
genus: Cebrella
Cebrella penelope Eliot & Kawazoé, 1983
C. p. penelope Eliot & Kawazoé, 1983 (northern, north- eastern & southern Mi (Mt. Apo, Mt. Kitanlad, Agusan))
C. p. kashiwaii Eliot & Kawazoé, 1983 (western Py)
genus: Lestranicus
Lestranicus yoshidai Eliot & Kawazoé, 1983 (Mi)
genus: Udara
Udara dilecta (Moore, 1879)
U. d. dilecta Moore, 1879 (Mi)
U. d. paracatius Fruhstorfer, 1917 (northern Mo)
Udara placidula (H. H. Druce, 1895)
U. p. placidula (H. H. Druce, 1895) (northern Mi)
U. p. kawazowei Hayashi, 1976 (Lz, Mi, Pn)
Udara cyma (Toxopeus, 1927)
U. c. elioti Hayashi, 1976 (Pn)
Udara camenae (de Nicéville, 1895)
U. c. filipina Murayama & Okamura, 1973 (Lz, Mo, Mi)
Udara dilectissima (H. H. Druce, 1895)
U. d. luzona Eliot & Kawazoé, 1983 (Lz, Mq, Mi)
Udara selma (H. H. Druce, 1895)
U. s. arsina (Fruhstorfer, 1922) (Mo)
U. s. mindanensis Eliot & Kawazoé, 1983 (Mi, N, Pn)
Udara santotomasana Eliot & Kawazoé, 1983
U. s. santotomasana Eliot & Kawazoé, 1983 (central & northern Lz, northern Mo)
U. s. subpura Eliot & Kawazoé, 1983 (southern Mi, Mt. Apo)
Udara aemulus Eliot & Kawazoé, 1983 (southern Mi, Mt. Apo)
Udara wilemani Eliot & Kawazoé, 1983 (northern Lz)
Udara nishiyamai Eliot & Kawazoé, 1983 (southern Mi, Mt. Apo)
Udara tyotaroi Eliot & Kawazoé, 1983 (southern Mi, Mt. Apo)

genus: Sidima
Sidima murayamai Eliot & Kawazoé, 1983 (northern Mi (Misamis))
genus: Acytolepis
Acytolepis puspa (Horsfield, [1828])
A. p. bazilana (Fruhstorfer, 1910) (Bas, Camiguin de Mi, Jl, Le, Mi, Sr, Twi, Mo)
A. p. cagaya (C. Felder & R. Felder, [1865]) (Lz, Mo, Pn)
genus: Celarchus
Celarchus archagathos (Fruhstorfer, 1910)
C. a archagathos (Fruhstorfer, 1910) (Bas, Camiguin de Mi, Mi)
C. a. leytensis Eliot & Kawazoé, 1983 (southern Le)
Celarchus hermarchus (Fruhstorfer, 1910)
C. h. hermarchus (Fruhstorfer, 1910) (Lz, Mq, Me N)
C. h. vesontia (Fruhstorfer, 1917) (Le, Mo, Romblon, Sr, Sn)
genus: Celastrina
Celastrina argiolus (Linnaeus, 1758)
C. a sugurui Eliot & Kawazoé, 1983 (northern Lz)
Celastrina philippina (Semper, 1889)
C. p. philippina (Semper, 1889) (Ca, Lz, Me, Mi, N, Py)
Celastrina algernoni (Fruhstorfer, 1917)
C. a. algernoni (Fruhstorfer, 1917) (Le, Lz, Mi)
C. a. kadazanensis Barlow, Banks & Holloway, 1971 (Pn)
Celastrina lavendularis (Moore, 1877)
C. l. hermesianax Fruhstorfer, 1910 (Le, Lz, Me, Mo, Mi, N)
genus: Callenya
Callenya kaguya Eliot & Kawazoé, 1983 (Pn)
genus: Monodontides
Monodontides apona (Fruhstorfer, 1910) (southern Mi, Mt. Apo)
Monodontides luzonensis Eliot & Kawazoé, 1983 (northern Lz, northern Mo)
Monodontides kolari (Ribbe, 1926) (Mi)
Monodontides hondai Eliot & Kawazoé, 1983 (Lz, Me, Mo, Mi, N, Pn, Py)
genus: Euchrysops
Euchrysops cnejus (Fabricius, 1798)
E. c. cnejus (Fabricius, 1798) (Cue, Le, Lz, Pn, Twi)
genus: Chilades
Chilades lajus (Stoll, [1780])
C. l. athena (C. Felder & R. Felder, [1865]) (Bl, Homonhna, Le, Mi, Pn, Sr, Twi)
Chilades parrhasius (Fabricius, 1793) (Bl, Ca, Le, Lz, Mi)
genus: Luthrodes
Luthrodes mindora (C. Felder & R. Felder, [1865]) (Bg, Cn, Cu, Camiguin de Lz, Homonhon, Le, Lz, Mq, Me, Mo, Mi, Pn, Sr, Sng, Twi, Ticao)
Luthrodes pandava (Horsfield, [1829])
L. p. vapanda (Semper, 1890) (Lz)
genus: Freyeria
Freyeria trochylus (Freyer, 1845)
F. t. gnoma (Snellen, 1876) (Lz)
F. t. putli Kollar (P)
genus: Cigaritis
Cigaritis syama (Horsfield, [1829])
C. s. negrita (C. Felder, 1862) (Bl, Cu, Camiguin de Lz, Ca, Le, Lz, Mq, Me, Mo, Mi, N, Py, Polillo, Sr)
genus: Austrozephyrus
Austrozephyrus reginae Schröder & Treadaway, 1982 (southern Pn)
genus: Arhopala
Arhopala anthelus (Westwood, [1851])
A. a. impar Evans, 1957 (Mo)
A. a. marinduquensis Hayashi, Schröder & Treadaway, 1984 (Mq)
A. a. paradisii Schröder & Treadaway, 1990 (Dt)
A. a. reverie Seki, 1994 (Py)
A. a. sanmariana Osada & Hashimoto, 1987 (north-eastern Lz)
A. a. saturatior Staudinger, 1889 (Pn)
A. a. sotades Fruhstorfer, 1914 (Bohol, Le, southern Lz, Mi, Sr)
Arhopala nakamotoi Hayashi, 1978 (Mi)
Arhopala eridanus (C. Felder, 1860)
A. e. dilutior Staudinger, 1889 (Bl, Cy, Pn)
Arhopala anarte (Hewitson, 1862) (Pn)
Arhopala trionoea Semper, 1890 (Le, Lz, Mq, Mi, Sr)
Arhopala alexandrae Schröder & Treadaway, 1978 (Mi, Bohol, Py, Lz, Mq)
Arhopala annulata (C. Felder, 1860)
A. a. annulata (C. Felder, 1860) (Mi, Pn)
Arhopala aedias (Hewitson, 1862)
A. a. agnis C. Felder & R. Felder, [1865] (Sb)
A. a. oenotria (Hewitson, 1869) (Cu, Le, Lz, Mo, Mi, Pn)
Arhopala sakaguchii Hayashi, 1981 (N)
Arhopala myrzala (Hewitson, 1869)
A. m. myrzala (Hewitson, 1869) (Lz, Mi)
Arhopala allata (Staudinger, 1889)
A. a. allata (Staudinger, 1889) (Pn, Mi)
A. a. pambihira Takanami, 1982 (Lz, Mi, Sr, north-eastern Mi)
Arhopala atosia (Hewitson, [1863])
A. a. aricia (Staudinger, 1889) (Pn)
Arhopala agesilaus (Staudinger, 1889)
A. a. agesilaus (Staudinger, 1889) (Pn)
A. a. philippa Evans, 1957 (Bl, Le, Mo, Mi)
Arhopala major (Staudinger, 1889) (Lz, Pn)
Arhopala amphimuta (C. Felder, 1860)
A. a. amphimuta (C. Felder, 1860) (Lz, Pn)
Arhopala hesba (Hewitson, 1869) (Bl, Le, Mo, Mi, Sr)
Arhopala anamuta Semper, 1890 (Mo, Mi)
Arhopala luzonensis Takanami & Ballantine, 1987 (north-eastern & south-eastern Lz)
Arhopala grandimuta Seki, 1993
A. g. grandimuta Seki, 1993 (Le)
A. g. takanamii Seki, 1993 (Mi)
Arhopala agesias (Hewitson, 1862) (P)
Arhopala abseus (Hewitson, 1862)
A. a. abseus (Hewitson, 1862) (Bg, Cn, Pn, Twi)
A. a. amphaea C. Felder & R. Felder, [1865] (Bas, Bl, Camiguin de Lz, Lz, Mq, Mo, Mi, N, Pnn, Sr)
Arhopala theba (Hewitson, 1863) (Le, Lz, Mq, Mo, Mi)
Arhopala matsutaroi Hayashi, 1979 (northern, central, southern & south-eastern Mi)
Arhopala aronya (Hewitson, 1869) (Mi)
A. a. aronya (Hewitson, 1869) (Dt, Le, Lz, Mq, Mo, Mi)
A. a. natsumiae Hayashi, 1981 (N)
Arhopala cleander (C. Felder, 1860)
A. c. malayica Bethune-Baker, 1903 (Camiguin de Lz, Le, Lz, Mi, N, Sb)
Arhopala athada (Staudinger, 1889)
A. a. wilemani Evans, 1957 (Mi)
Arhopala rudepoema Seki, 1994 (Le, Mq, Mo, Mi, N, Pn)
Arhopala silhetensis (Hewitson, 1862)
A. s. philippina Hayashi, 1981 (Le, Lz, Mq, Mo, Mi, N)
A. s. malayica Bethune-Baker (P)
Arhopala zambra Swinhoe, [1911]
A. z. kitamurai Seki, 1994 (Mo)
A. z plateni Evans, 1957 (Le, Mi)
A. z. triviata Seki, 1994 (N)
Arhopala agrata de Nicéville, 1890
A. a. shiorzui Hayashi, 1976 (Pn)
Arhopala evansi Corbet, 1941 (Sb)
Arhopala aroa (Hewitson, [1863])
A. a. aroa Hewitson, 1863 (Bas)
Arhopala selta (Hewitson, 1869)
A. s.hislopi Eliot, 1962 (Twi)
Arhopala phaenops (C. Felder & R. Felder, [1865])
A. p. phaenops (C. Felder & R. Felder, [1865]) (Bl, Camiguin de Lz, Camiguin de Mi, Lz, Mo, Mi)
A. p. detrita (Staudinger, 1889) (Pn)
A. p. sandakani Bethune-Baker, 1896 (Twi)
A. p. termerion Fruhstorfer, 1914 (Bas)
Arhopala sublustris Bethune-Baker, 1904
A. s. sublustris Bethune-Baker, 1904 (Twi)
Arhopala alitaeus (Hewitson, 1862)
A. a. mindanaensis Bethune-Baker, 1904 (Le, Mi, Pnn, Sr)
A. a. myrtale (Staudinger, 1889) (Pn)
A. a. shigae Murayama & Okamura, 1973 (Ba, Bl, Lz, Mq, N, Sn)
A. a. zilensis Fruhstorfer, 1914 (Bas)
A. a. panta Evans (P)
Arhopala myrtha (Staudinger, 1889) (Pn)
Arhopala tephlis (Hewitson, 1869)
A. t. unnoi Hayashi, 1976 (Ba, Bl, Cn, Cu, Lz, Mi, Pn, Sr, Sn)
Arhopala bazalus (Hewitson, 1862)
A. b. asagiae Hayashi, 1978 (Mi)
Arhopala horsfieldi (Pagenstecher, 1890)
A. h. palawanica Hayashi, 1976 (Pn)
Arhopala eumolphus (Cramer, [1780])
A. e. aristomachus Fruhstorfer, 1914 (Pn)
Arhopala staudingeri Semper, 1890
A. s. staudingeri Semper, 1890 (Bl, Le, Mi, Pnn, Sr)
A. s. castagnedai Osada & Hashimoto, 1987 (Lz)
A. s. negrosiana Hayashi, 1981 (N)
Arhopala chamaeleona Bethune-Baker 1903
A. c. maputi Takanami, 1984 (Lz, Mq, Mo)
A. c. mizunumai Hayashi, 1978 (Dt, Le, Mi, N, Pnn, Sr)
Arhopala tindongani Nuyda & Takanami, 1990 (northern Lz)
Arhopala corinda (Hewitson, 1869)
A. c. corinda (Hewitson, 1869) (Ba, Cy, Dt, Dumaran, Homonhon, Le, Lz, Mq, Me, Mo, Mi, N, Sr, Sb)
Arhopala agaba (Hewitson, 1862) (Mi)
Arhopala pseudocentaurus (Doubleday, 1847)
A. p. aglais (C. Felder & R. Felder, [1865]) (Ba, Cy, Dt, Dumaran, Homonhon, Le, Lz, Mq, Me, Mo, Mi, Polillo, Sr, Sn, Twi)
Arhopala buddha Bethune-Baker, 1903
A. b. cooperi Evans, 1925 (P)
Arhopala ocrida (Hewitson, 1869)
A. o. ocrida (Hewitson, 1869) (Bl, Le, Lz, Mi, Sr, Sn, Twi)
A. o. cionii Schröder & Treadaway, 1994 (Sng, Twi)
Arhopala hinigugma Takanami, 1985 (Le, Lz, Mi, N)
Arhopala alesia (C. Felder & R. Felder, 1862)
A. a. alesia (C. Felder & R. Felder, 1862) (Le, Lz, Mq, Mo, Mi, Twi)
A. a. mio Hayashi, 1981 (N)
Arhopala alaconia (Hewitson, 1869)
A. a. oberthueri Staudinger, 1889 (Pn)
Arhopala ilocana Osada & Hashimoto, 1987 (northern Lz)
Arhopala arsenius (C. Felder & R. Felder, [1865]) (Lz, Mo)
A. a. arsenius (C. Felder & R. Felder, [1865]) (Lz, N)
A. a. everetti Evans, 1957 (Mo)
Arhopala epimete (Staudinger, 1889)
A. e. epimete Staudinger, 1889 (Pn)
A. e. magindana Odasa, 1987 (north-eastern Mi)
Arhopala inornata (C. Felder & R. Felder, 1860)
A. i. inornata C. Felder & R. Felder, 1860 (P)
Arhopala avatha de Nicéville, 1896
A. a. avatha de Nicéville, 1896 (Twi)
A. a. lana Evans, 1957 (Mi, Py)
Arhopala davaona Semper, 1890 (Mi)
Arhopala fulla (Hewitson, 1862)
A. f. santa Evans, 1957 (Lz, Mq, Mo, Mi)
Arhopala paraganesa (de Nicéville, 1882)
A. p. tomokoae Hayashi, 1976 (Pn)
Arhopala birmana Moore, 1884
A. b. hiurai Hayashi, 1976 (Pn)
Arhopala schroederi Hayashi, 1981 (Pn)
genus: Flos
Flos diardi (Hewitson, 1862)
F. d. capeta Hewitson, 1878 (Le, Lz, Mq, Me, Mo, Mi, N, Pn, Sr, Sng, Sb, Tawi-atwi)
Flos fulgida (Hewitson, [1863])
F. f. zilana Fruhstorfer, 1900 (Bas, Bl, Mo, Mi)
Flos anniella (Hewitson, 1862)
F. a. anniella (Hewitson, 1862) (Le, Lz, Mq, Mo, Mi, N, Pn)
Flos apidanus (Cramer, [1777])
F. a. himna Fruhstorfer, 1914 (Mi)
F. a. palawanus Staudinger, 1889 (Bl, Bl, Lz, Mo, Pn, Py, Sr)
F. a. saturatus Snellen, 1890
Flos iriya Fruhstorfer, 1914 endemic (Bas, Lz, Mo, Mi, Py)
Flos morphina (Distant, 1884)
F. m. morphina (Distant, 1884) (Pn)
Flos setsuroi Hayashi, 1981 (Mq, Mo)
genus: Surendra
Surendra manilana (C. Felder & R. Felder, 1862) endemic
S. m. manilana (C. Felder & R. Felder, 1862) (Lz, Mq, Mo, Mi, N, Py)
S. m. johnelioti Schröder & Treadaway, 1993 (Bg)
Surendra vivarna (Horsfield, [1829])
S. v. palowana Staudinger, 1889 (Bl, Cn, Pn)
genus: Semanga
Semanga superba (H. Druce, 1873)
S. s. superba (H. Druce, 1873) (Sng)
genus: Amblypodia
Amblypodia narada (Horsfield, [1828])
A. n. erichsonii Felder, 1865 (Bas, Bl, Cu, Le, Lz, Mq, Mo, N, Pn, Twi)
A. n. sibutensis Treadaway & Nuyda, 1993 (Sb)
A. n. plateni Riley, 1922 (Mi)
genus: Iraota
Iraota rochana (Horsfield, [1829])

I. r. austrosuluensis Schröder & Treadaway, 1989 (Bg, Sng, Twi)
I. r. boudanti Treadaway & Nuyda, 1993 (Sb)
I. r. indalawanae Schröder & Treadaway, 1993 (Bl)
I. r. garzoni Schröder & Treadaway, 1986 (N)
I. r. lazarena C. Felder & R. Felder, 1862 (Ba, Bl, Cu, Dt, Le, Lz, Mq, Mo, Mi, Pnn, Sr)
I. r. ottonis Fruhstorfer, 1907 (Cn, Pn)
I. r. boholica Fruhstorfer (Bli)
genus: Catapaecilma
Catapaecilma gracilis Semper, 1890 (Bl, Cu, Le, Lz, Mo, Mi, Pnn, Sr) endemic
Catapaecilma nakamotoi Hayashi, 1979 (eastern Mi)
Catapaecilma evansi Pendlebury, 1933
C. e. evansi Pendlebury, 1933 (Pn)
C. e. parva Schröder & Treadaway, 1988 (northern N)
C. e. rizali Takanami, 1984 (Camiguin de Lz, Lz, Mq, Mo)
Catapaecilma nuydai Takanami, 1984 (Mi (Bukidnon))
genus: Hypothecla
Hypothecla astyla (C. Felder & R. Felder, 1862)
H. a. astyala (C. Felder & R. Felder, 1862) (Lz, Mq, Mo)
H. a. mindanaensis Fruhstorfer, 1912 (Biliran, Bl, Cu, Le, Mi, Pnn, Sr)
H. a. palawensis Hayashi, 1976 (Pn)
H. a. tegea Fruhstorfer, 1912 (Bas)
genus: Loxura
Loxura cassiopeia Distant, 1884
L. c. owadai Hayashi, 1977 (Cu, Mi)
L. c. yilma Fruhstorfer, 1926 (Pn, Mi)
L. c. amatica (Pn)
Loxura atymnus (Stoll, [1780])
L. a. luzonica Swinhoe, 1917 (Lz)
genus: Eooxylides
Eooxylides tharis (Geyer, 1837)
E. t. tharisides Fruhstorfer, 1904 (Bl)
Eooxylides meduana (Hewitson, 1869) endemic (Bl, Cu, Dt, Le, Mi, Pnn, Sr)
Eooxylides etias (Distant & Pryer, 1887)
E. e. shahaniae Treadaway & Nuyda, 1994 (Bas)
genus: Drina
Drina discophora (C. Felder & R. Felder, 1862) endemic (Alabat, Batanes, Lz, Mq, Mo)
Drina mavortia (Hewitson, 1869) endemic (Bl, Cu, Le, Mi, Sr)
Drina borromeorum Schröder & Treadaway, 1991 endemic (Twi)
genus: Horaga
Horaga lefebvrei (C. Felder & R. Felder, 1862) endemic
H. l. lefebvrei (C. Felder & R. Felder, 1862) (Lz)
H. l. osma Fruhstorfer, 1912 (Bl, Le, Mi, N, Pnn, Sr)
H. l. osmana Cowan, 1966 (Mo)
Horaga chalcedonyx Fruhstorfer, 1914
Horaga natsumiae Hayashi, 1984 endemic (Camiguin de Lz, Le, Mq, Mo, Mi, N)
Horaga bilineata Semper, 1890 endemic (Camiguin de Lz, Le, Lz, Mq, Mo, Mi, N, Pnn, Pn)
Horaga albimacula (Wood-Mason & de Nicéville, 1881)
H. a. anytus Staudinger, 1889 (Pn)
Horaga syrinx (C. Felder, 1860)
H. s. ashinica Murayama & Okamura, 1973 (Bl, Camiguin de Lz, Le, Lz, Mq, Me, Mo, Mi, N, Py, Pnn, Sn, Siquijor)
H. s. camiguina Semper, 1890 (Camiguin de Mi)
H. s. decolor Staudinger, 1889 (Pn)
H. s. joloana Fruhstorfer, 1912 (Jl, Sb, Twi)
H. s. paulla Fruhstorfer, 1912 (Bas)
Horaga amethysta H. H. Druce, [1903]
H. a. sibutuensis Schröder & Treadaway, 1990 (Sb)
genus: Cheritra
Cheritra aenea Semper, 1890 endemic (Mo)
Cheritra orpheus (C. Felder & R. Felder, [1865])
C. o. orpheus (C. Felder & R. Felder, [1865]) (Lz, Mq, Mo, N, Ticao)
C. o. eurydice Fruhstorfer, 1912 (Cn, Pn)
C. o. orphnine Cowan, 1967 (Le, Mi, Sri)
genus: Ritra
Ritra aurea (H. Druce, 1873)
R. a. aurea (H. Druce, 1873) (Bl, Pn)
genus: Drupadia
Drupadia hayashii Schröder & Treadaway, 1989 (Sb)
Drupadia ravindra (Horsfield, [1828])
D. r. balabacola Schröder & Treadaway, 1989 (Bl)
D. r. joloana Staudinger, 1889 (Jl, Sng, Sb, Twi)
D. r. okurai M. Okano & T. Okano, 1991 (Mi)
D. r. ravindrina Staudinger, 1889 (Pn, Balabac)
D. r. resoluta Cowan, 1974 (Lz, Mo, Polilloi)
Drupadia rufotaenia (Fruhstorfer, [1912])
D. r. praecox Cowan, 1974 (Mo)
D. r. torquata Cowan, 1974 (Bl, Pn)
Drupadia theda (C. Felder & R. Felder, 1862)
D. t. theda C. Felder & R. Felder, 1862) (Lz, Mq, Me, Py (Mo, Cu, Mi)
D. t. miyo Takanami, 1987 (Mo)
D. t. osadai Takanami, 1987 (Bl)
D. t. pekas Takanami, 1982 (Le, north-eastern Mi, Pnn, Sr)
D. t. tawiensis Schröder & Treadaway, 1989 (Sng, Tawitawi)
D. t. unicolor Staudinger, 1889 (Pni)
Drupadia niasica (Röber, 1886)
D. n. florens Cowan, 1974 (Le, Mi, Pn)
D. n. natinus Takanami, 1987 (Mo)
D. n. thaenia H. H. Druce, 1895 (Jl)
genus: Pratapa
Pratapa ismaeli Schröder & Treadaway, 1983 endemic (northern & southern Mi (Mt. Apo, Mt. Kitanlad))
Pratapa tyotaroi Hayashi, 1981
P. t. tyotaroi Hayashi, 1981 (Mq)
P. t. mindorensis Tsukada & Nishiyama, 1995 (Mo)
Pratapa icetoides (Elwes, [1893])
P. i. marikit Schröder & Treadaway, 1986 (Dumaran, Pn)
Pratapa deva (Moore, [1858])
P. d. devana H. H. Druce, 1895 (Lz, Mi)
genus: Tajuria
Tajuria igolotiana Murayama & Okamura, 1973 endemic
T. i. igolotiana Murayama & Okamura, 1973 (Lz)
T. i. fumiae Hayashi, 1984 (Mi)
Tajuria deudorix (Hewitson, 1869)
T. d. deudorix (Hewitson, 1869) (Le, Mi)
T. d. primitivoi Osada, 1987 (Bl)
T. d. yuhkichii Hayashi, 1984 (Pn)
T. d. zoletai Osada, 1987 (Camiguin de Lz, Lz, Mq, Mo)
Tajuria alangani Schröder, Treadaway & Nuyda, 1993 endemic (Mo)
Tajuria mantra (C. Felder & R. Felder, 1860)
T. m. mantra (C. Felder & R. Felder, 1860) (Pn)
T. m. kimia Treadaway & Nuyda, 1995 (Sng)
T. m. lucrosa Fruhstorfer, 1912 (Bl, Le, north(eastern Mi, N, Pnn, Sr)
T. m. vergara Semper, 1890 (Mi excluding north-eastern)
Tajuria isaeus (Hewitson, [1865])
T. i. isaeus (Hewitson, [1865]) (Pn)
Tajuria berenis H. H. Druce, 1896
T. b. berenis H. H. Druce, 1896 (Mi)
Tajuria dominus H. H. Druce, 1895
T. d. dominus H. H. Druce, 1895 (Dumaran, Pn)
Tajuria matsutaroi Hayashi, 1984 (Le, southern Mi (Mt. Apo))
Tajuria mizunumai Hayashi, 1978 (southern Mi (Mt. Apo))
Tajuria jalajala (C. Felder, 1862)
T. j. jalajala (C. Felder, 1862) (Bl, Camiguin de Mi, Le, Lz, Mq, Me, Mo, Mi, N, Py, Pnn, Polillo, Sr)
T. j. steffi Hayashi, Schröder & Treadaway, 1988 (Homonhon)
genus: Matsutaroa
Matsutaroa iljai Hayashi, Schröder & Treadaway, 1988 (Me, northern N, western Py)
genus: Dacalana
Dacalana sannio H. H. Druce, 1895
D. s. sannio H. H. Druce, 1895 (Mi, Sulu Archipelago)
D. s. lucillae Hayashi, Schröder & Treadaway, 1983 (Lz)
Dacalana aristarchus Fruhstorfer, 1912 endemic (Bas, Mi)
Dacalana kurosawai Hayashi, 1976 (Cn, Pn)
Dacalana monaspona Schröder & Treadaway, 1978 endemic
D. m. monaspona Schröder & Treadaway, 1978 (Mi [Mt. Apo]))
D. m. marinduquensis Hayashi, Schröder & Treadaway, 1983 (Lz, Mq, Mo)
Dacalana akayamai Hayashi, Schröder & Treadaway, 1983 (Mi)
Dacalana liaoi Hayashi, Schröder & Treadaway, 1983 (N, Py)
Dacalana irmae Hayashi, Schröder & Treadaway, 1983 (Sn)
Dacalana mio Hayashi, Schröder & Treadaway, 1983 (Mi)
Dacalana polyorketes Fruhstorfer, 1912 endemic
D. p. polyorketes Fruhstorfer, 1912 (Le, Mi, Pnn, Sr)
D. p. kawamurai Takanami, 1988 (Sng)
D. p. laduanae Schröder & Treadaway, 1989 (Homonhon)
Dacalana treadawayi Hayashi, 1984 (Mi)
genus: Neocheritra
Neocheritra manata Semper, 1890 endemic
N. m. manata Semper, 1890 (Mi (Surigao & South Cotabato))
N. m. gertrudes Schröder & Treadaway, 1978 (southern Mi (Mt. Apo))
genus: Manto
Manto hypoleuca (Hewitson, [1865])
M. h. martina (Hewitson, 1869) (Bl, Pn)
genus: Paruparo
Paruparo mamertina (Hewitson, 1869) endemic
P. m. mamertina (Hewitson, 1869) (eastern, southern & central Mi)
P. m. jeanhooperae Schroder & Treadaway, 1988 (Homonhon, northern Sr)
P. m. rahmani (Jumalon, 1975) (southern Le)
Paruparo cebuensis (Jumalon, 1975)
P. c. cebuensis (Jumalon, 1975) (Cu)
P. c. amethystina Schröder & Treadaway, 1988 (Homonhon)
P. c. chotaroi (Hayashi, 1977) (north-eastern Mi)
P. c. medicieloi M. Okano & T. Okano, 1991 (Le)
P. c. soloni M. Okano & T. Okano, 1990 (Bl)
P. c. treadawayi (Jumalon, 1975) (N)
Paruparo annie Takanami, 1982 (south-eastern Lz)
Paruparo rosemarie endemic Seki, 1993 (Le)
Paruparo violacea endemic (Schröder & Treadaway, 1978) (north-eastern Mi)
Paruparo lumawigi endemic (Schröder, 1976)
P. l. lumawigi (Schröder, 1976) (Camiguin de Lz, Lz, Mq)
P. l. jumaloni Treadaway & Nuyda, 1993 (Sn)
P. l. mindorana Schröder & Treadaway, 1993 (Mo)
P. l. panayensis Hayashi, (Mi, western Py)
Paruparo mio Hayashi, (Mi (Surigao))
genus: Eliotia
Eliotia mioae Hayashi, 1978 (eastern Mi)
Eliotia australis Schröder & Treadaway, 1990 endemic (south-western Mi)
Eliotia circumdata Schröder, Treadaway & Hayashi, 1981 endemic
E. c. circumdata Schröder, Treadaway & Hayashi, 1981 (Lz, Mq, Mo)
E. c. panayensis Schröder, Treadaway & Hayashi, 1981 (N, Py)
Eliotia jalindra (Horsfield, [1829])
E. j. balabacensis Schröder & Treadaway, 1986 (Bl)
E. j. maganda Takanami, 1982 (Mi)
E. j. mindorensis Schröder & Treadaway, 1985 (Mo)
E. j. palawandra Staudinger, 1889 (Dumaran, Pn)
E. j. shiraishii Takanami, 1984 (north-western Lz)
E. j. obsoleta Schröder & Treadaway, 1993 (Sng, Twi)
Eliotia plateni Semper, 1890
E. p. plateni (Semper, 1890) endemic (Bas, Le, Mi, Sr)
E. p. parvula Schröder & Treadaway, 1989 (Sng)
Eliotia mariaba (Hewitson, 1869) endemic (Le, Mi, Sr)
genus: Suasa
Suasa lisides (Hewitson, [1863])
S. l. liris Staudinger, 1889 (Pn)
genus: Remelana
Remelana davisi Jumalon, 1975 endemic
R. l. davisi Jumalon, 1975 (Mi)
R. l. fulminans Schröder & Treadaway, 1978 (Lz, Mq)
R. l. negrosensis M. Okano & T. Okano, 1990 (N)
R. l. noeli Treadaway & Nuyda, 1993 (Mo)
Remelana jangala (Horsfield, [1829])
R. j. esra Fruhstorfer, 1907 (Cn, Dumaran, Pn)
R. j. westermanni (C. Felder & R. Felder, [1865]) (Bl, Bas, Bl, Bg, Cu, Camiguin de Lz, Ca, Dt, Homonhon, Le, Lz, Mq, Me, Mo, Mi, N, Pnn, Py, Romblon, Sr, Sng, Sb, Sn, Twi
genus: Britomartis
Britomartis igarashii Hayashi, 1976 (Pn)
genus: Ancema
Ancema blanka (de Nicéville, 1894)
A. b. blanka (de Nicéville, 1894) (Pn)
genus: Pseudotajuria
Pseudotajuria donatana (de Nicéville, [1889])
P. d. bilara M. Okano & T. Okano, 1990 (Bl)
P. d. mansaka Osada, 1987 (south-eastern Mi)
genus: Hypolycaena
Hypolycaena thecloides (C. Felder & R. Felder, 1860)
H. t. camotana Fruhstorfer, 1912 (Ca)
H. t. philippina Staudinger, 1889 (Cn, Cu, Camiguin de Lz, Lz, Mo, Mi, Pn, Sn)
H. t. vardara Fruhstorfer, 1912 (Siargao)
Hypolycaena erylus (Godart, [1824])
H. e. aimnestus Fruhstorfer, 1912 (Cy, Dumaran, Pn, Mo)
H. e. georgius Fruhstorfer, 1912 (Bg, Jl, Sng, Si, Sb, Twi)
H. e. orsiphantes Fruhstorfer, 1912 (Bas, Camiguin de Mi, Dt, Le, Mi, Sr)
H. e. tmolus C. Felder & R. Felder, 1862 (Camiguin de Lz, Lz, Mq, Me, Mo, N, Py, Romblon, Sni)
Hypolycaena sipylus (C. Felder, 1860)
H. s. tharrytas C. Felder & R. Felder, 1862 (Alabat, Bl, Bas, Bl, Cu, Camiguin de Mi, Jl, Le, Lz, Mq, Me, Mo, Mi, Pn, Py, Sr)
Hypolycaena ithna Hewitson, 1869 (Camiguin de Lz, Cu, Dumaran, Lz, Mq, Mi, Pn, Py, Sng, Sn, Si, Twi)
Hypolycaena othona Hewitson, [1865]
H. o. waltraudae Treadaway & Nuyda, 1994 (Pn)
Hypolycaena irawana Hayashi, (Pn)
Hypolycaena schroederi Hayashi, 1984 (Mi, Sr)
Hypolycaena shirozui Hayashi, 1981
H. s. shirozui Hayashi, 1981 (Le, Mi, Sr)
H. s. madilimi Treadaway & Nuyda, 1995 (N)
Hypolycaena toshikoae Hayashi, 1984 (Lz)
genus: Zeltus
Zeltus amasa (Hewitson, [1865])
Z. a. masaya Takanami, 1984 (Mi)
Z. a. miyatakei Hayashi, 1977 (Pn)
genus: Deudorix
Deudorix epijarbas (Moore, [1858])
D. e. epijarba (Moore, [1858]) (Catanduanes, Cu, Le, Lz, Mq, Me, Mo, Mi, N, Pn, Py, Sr, Sb, Twi)
D. e. corolianus Fruhstorfer (Pn, P)
Deudorix philippinensis Schröder, Treadaway & Hayashi, 1981 (Mq, Me, Mo, Mi, N, Sn)
Deudorix apayao Schröder & Treadaway, 1983 (northern & central Pn)
genus: Virachola
Virachola smilis (Hewitson, [1863])
V. s. vocetius Fruhstorfer, 1912 (Ba, Lz, Mq, Mo, Mi, Pn)
Virachola kessuma (Horsfield, [1829])
V. k. deliochus (Hewitson, 1874) (Mi, Pn)
Virachola masamichii Okubo, 1983 (south-eastern Mi)
genus: Sinthusa
Sinthusa mindanensis Hayashi, Schröder & Treadaway, 1978
S. m. mindanensis Hayashi, Schröder & Treadaway, 1978 (southern Mi (Mt. Apo)
S. m. stephaniae Hayashi, Schröder & Treadaway, 1978 (Le, northern Mi (Bukidnon), Sr)
S. m. yoshiae Hayashi, 1981 (N)
Sinthusa natsumiae Hayashi, 1979
S. n. natsumiae Hayashi, 1979 (Le, Mi)
S. n. ondai Takanami, 1982 (Lz, Mq, Mo, N)
Sinthusa privata Fruhstorfer
S. p. kawazoei Hayashi, 1976 (Pn)
Sinthusa nasaka (Horsfield, [1829])
S. n. ogatai Hayashi, 1976 (Pn)
Sinthusa peregrinus Staudinger, 1889 (Bas, Mi, Pn)
genus: Araotes
Araotes lapithis (Moore, [1858])
A. l. arianus Fruhstorfer, 1912 (Pn)
Araotes perrhaebis Semper, 1890 (Bas, Mi)
genus: Bindahara
Bindahara phocides (Fabricius, 1793)
B. p. phocides (Fabricius, 1793) (Bl, Cn, Pn, Sng, Sb, Twi)
B. p. origenes Fruhstorfer, 1912 (Catanduanes, Cu, Camiguin de Mi, Ca, Lz, Mq, Me, Mo, Mi, Py, Sr, Sni)
genus: Rapala
Rapala diopites (Hewitson, 1869)
R. d. diopites (Hewitson, 1869) (Camiguin de Lz)
R. d. alcetas Staudinger, 1889 (Bl, Cn, Pn)
R. d. alcetina Semper, 1890 (Bas, Bl, Cu, Camiguin de Mi, Ca, Dt, Gu, Le, Lz, Mq, Me, Mo, Mi, N, Py, Sr, Sng, Sn, Sb, Twi)
R. d. bandatara Fruhstorfer (Baslian, Jl)
R. d. ashinensis Murayama & Okamura (Lz to south-eastern Mindanao)
Rapala elcia (Hewitson, 1863)
R. e. elcia (Hewitson, 1863) (Lz, Mq, Polillo)
Rapala hades (de Nicéville, [1895]) (Mi, southern N, Py)
Rapala masara Osada, 1987 (south-eastern Mi)
Rapala tomokoae Hayashi, Schröder & Treadaway, 1978
R. t. tomokoae Hayashi, Schröder & Treadaway, 1978 (Le, Mi, Sr, Twi)
R. t. bilara M. Okano & T. Okano, 1990 (Bl)
R. t. takanamii Hayashi, 1984 (N, Py)
Rapala zamona Fruhstorfer, 1912 (Ba, Lz)
Rapala manea (Hewitson, [1863])
R. m. ingana Fruhstorfer, 1912 (Pn, P excluding Bas)
R. m. philippensis Fruhstorfer, 1912 (Bl, Lz, Mq, Mo, Mi, N, Sb, Twi)
Rapala varuna (Horsfield, [1829])
R. v. nada Fruhstorfer, 1912 (Bl, Lz, Mq, Mo, Mi, N, Sb, Twi)
Rapala rhoecus de Nicéville, [1895]
R. r. melida Fruhstorfer, 1912 (Pn)
Rapala scintilla de Nicéville, [1890]
R. s. nemana Semper, 1890 (Ba, Camiguin de Mi, Le, Mq, Mi, Pn, Pnn, Sr)
Rapala dieneces (Hewitson, 1878)
R. d. dieneces (Hewitson, 1878) (Bas, Mi, Pn, Sng)
R. d. valeria Fruhstorfer (Bas)
Rapala caerulescens Staudinger, 1889 (Bas, Cu, Jl, Lz, Mq, Mo, Mi, Sn
Rapala suffusa (Moore, [1879])
R. s. anabasis Staudinger, 1889 (Bl, Pn)
Rapala phrangida Fruhstorfer, 1912 (Le, Lz)
Rapala damona Swinhoe, 1890 (Mo, Pn)

Riodinidae
genus: Zemeros
Zemeros flegyas (Cramer, [1780])
Z. f. hondai Hayashi, 1976
genus: Dodona
Dodona deodata Hewitson, 1876
D. d. aponata Semper, 1889 (southern Mi (Mt. Apo))
D. d. malindangensis Schröder & Treadaway, 1988 (north(western Mi (Mt. Malindang))
D. d. ohtsukai Hayashi, 1984 (N (Mt. Canlaon))
D. d. sakaii Hayashi, 1976 (Pn)
D. d. treadawayi Hanafusa, 1989 (northern Lzi)
genus: Laxita
Laxita thuisto (Hewitson, 1861)
L. t. eutyches Fruhstorfer (Pn)
genus: Paralaxita
Paralaxita orphna (Boisduval, 1836)
P. o. orphna (Boisduval, 1836) (Pn)
genus: Taxila
Taxila haquinus (Fabricius, 1793)
T. h. palawanicus Staudinger, 1889 (Bl, Pn)
genus: Abisara
Abisara kausambi C. Felder & R. Felder, 1860
A. k. aja Fruhstorfer, 1904 (Bl, Cn, Pn)
Abisara echerius (Stoll, 1790)
A. e. bazilensis Fruhstorfer, 1900 (Bas)
A. e. cavana Schröder & Treadaway, 1978 (Sb)
A. e. laura Fruhstorfer, 1904 (Lz, Mo)
A. e. palawana Schröder & Treadaway, 1889 (Pn)
A. e. panayensis Medicielo & Hanafusa, 1994 (Py)
A. e. simillima Schröder & Treadaway, 1995 (Bg, Sng, Twi)
Abisara saturata (Moore, [1878])
A. s. corbeti Bennett, 1950 (Mi)
Abisara mindanaensis Semper, 1892
A. m. mindanensis Semper, 1892 (Mi)
A. m. boholensis M. Okano & T. Okano, 1993 (Bl, Le)
A. m. canlaonensis Medicielo & Hanafusa, 1994 (N)
A. m. cudaca Fruhstorfer, 1914 (Lz)
A. m. mudita Fruhstorfer, 1914 (Mo)
Abisara geza Fruhstorfer, [1904]
A. g. litavicus Fruhstorfer, 1912 (Pn)

Hesperiidae
genus: Bibasis
Bibasis oedipodea (Swainson, 1820)
B. o. oedipodea (Swainson, 1820) (Bl, Pn, Sng, Si, Twi)
B. o. paltra Evans, 1949 (Cu, Le, Lz, Mq, Mi, Mo, N)
Bibasis etelka (Hewitson, [1867]) (Mi, Pn)
Bibasis harisa (Moore, [1866])
B. h. consobrina (Plötz, 1884) (Sng, Si)
B. h. pala de Jong & Treadaway, 1993 (Pn)
B. h. grandis de Jong & Treadaway, 1993 (Dt, Le, Sr)
Bibasis gomata (Moore, [1866])
B. g. lorquini (Mabille, 1876) (Calamian, Camiguin de Lz, Le, Lz, Mq, Mi, Mo, N, Pn, Py, Pl)
Bibasis sena (Moore, [1866])
B. s. palawana (Staudinger, 1889) (Bl, Calamian, Cu, Hn, Le, Lz, Mq, Mi, N, Pn, Py, Pl, Sng, Si, Sn, Twi)
genus: Hasora
Hasora proxissima Elwes & Edwards, 1897
H. p. proxissima Elwes & Edwards, 1897 (Le, Mo, Mi)
H. p. siva Evans, 1932 (Pn)
Hasora borneensis Elwes & Edwards, 1897
H. b. luza Evans, 1949 (Le, Lz, Me, Mi, Mo, N, Pnn, Le, Sr)
Hasora mavis Evans, 1934 (Lz, N, Pnn, Sr)
Hasora chromus (Cramer, [1780])
H. c. chromus (Cramer, [1780]) (Bas, Le, Mq, N, Twi, Ticao)
Hasora taminatus (Hübner, 1818)
H. t. malayana (C. Felder & R. Felder, 1860) (Bl, southern Pn)
H. t. padma Fruhstorfer, 1911 (Bas, Bl, Camiguin de Lz, Cu, Hn, Le, Lz, Mq, Me, Mo, Mi, N, central and northern Pn, Pnn, Py, Pnn, Romblon, Sn, Twi, Ticao)
Hasora schoenherr (Latreille, [1824])
H. s. babuyana Treadaway & Nuyda, 1995 (Babuyan)
H. s. chuza (Hewitson, [1867]) (Bl, Pn)
H. s. saida (Hewitson, [1867]) (Bl, Camiguin de Mi, Le, Lz, Mq, Mi, Mo, N, Pnn, Py, Sr, Sn)
Hasora mixta (Mabille, 1876)
H. m. mixta (Mabille, 1876) (Bas, Biliran, Cu, Camiguin de Lz, Le, Lz, Mq, Me, Mi, Mo, N, Pnn, Py, Sr, Sn)
H. m. prabha Fruhstorfer, 1911 (Bl, Pn, Twi)
Hasora badra (Moore, [1858])
H. b. badra (Moore, [1858]) (Bl, Calamian, Pn)
Hasora quadripunctata (Mabille, 1876)
H. q. gnaeus (Plötz, 1884) (Camiguin de Mi, Dt, Le, Mi, Mo, Sr)
Hasora vitta (Butler, 1870)
H. v. proximata (Staudinger, 1889) (Bl, Lz, Mindanao, Mo, Pn)
Hasora moestissima (Mabille, 1876)
H. m. moestissima (Mabille, 1876) (Camiguin de Mi, Hn, Le, Lz, Me, Mi, Mo, N, Sr)
Hasora caeruleostriata de Jong, 1982 (Hn, Le, Lz, Me, N, Pn, Py, Sr)
Hasora khoda (Mabille, 1876)
H. k. minsona Swinhoe, 1907 (Bl, Le, Lz, Mq, N, Pn, Py, Sr, Twi)
Hasora leucospila (Mabille, 1891)
H. l. leucospila (Mabille, 1891) (Bas, Hn, Le, Lz, Mi, Mo, N, Pn, Sr)
genus: Badamia
Badamia exclamationis (Fabricius, 1775) (Bas, Hn, Le, Lz, Mq, Mi, N, Pn, Pl, Sr, Si, Twi, Ticao)
genus: Choaspes
Choaspes plateni (Staudinger, 1888)
C. p. adhara Fruhstorfer, 1911 (Mi)
C. p. negrosa de Jong & Treadaway, 1993 (N)
C. p. boreus de Jong & Treadaway, 1993 (Lz, Mo)
C. p. visaya de Jong, 1980 (Biliran, Bl, Le, Pnn, Sr)
C. p. caudatus Evans, 1932 (Pn)
Choaspes estrella de Jong, 1980
C. e. estrella de Jong, 1980 (Lz, Mo, N, Py)
C. e. pallens Schröder & Treadaway, 1986 (Le, Mi, Sr)
Choaspes subcaudatus (C. Felder & R. Felder, [1867])
C. s. crawfurdi Distant, 1886 (Twi)
genus: Celaenorrhinus
Celaenorrhinus nigricans (de Nicéville, 1885)
C. n. mindanus de Jong, 1981 (Le, Lz, Mi)
Celaenorrhinus putra (Moore, [1866])
C. p. brahmaputra Elwes & Edwards, 1897 (Pn)
Celaenorrhinus treadawayi de Jong, 1981
C. t. treadawayi de Jong, 1981 (Mi)
C. t. samarensis de Jong, 1981 (Sr)
Celaenorrhinus asmara (Butler, [1879])
C. a. palajava (Staudinger, 1889) (Pn)
Celaenorrhinus ficulnea (Hewitson, 1868)
C. f. ficulnea (Hewitson, 1868) (Pn)
Celaenorrhinus bazilanus (Fruhstorfer, 1909)
C. b. bazilanus (Fruhstorfer, 1909) (Bas, Mi)
Celaenorrhinus halconis de Jong & Treadaway, 1993 (Mo (Mt. Halcon))
genus: Tapena
Tapena thwaitesi Moore, 1881
T. t. bornea Evans, 1931 (Bl, Pn)
genus: Darpa
Darpa pteria (Hewitson, 1868)
D. p. pteria (Hewitson, 1868) (Le, Lz, Mi)
D. p. dealbata Distant, 1886 (Pn)
genus: Odina
Odina cuneiformis (Semper, 1892) (Camiguin de Lz, Le, Lz, Mq, Mo, Pn)
genus: Coladenia
Coladenia igna (Semper, 1892)
C. i. igna (Semper, 1892) (Le, Lz, Mi, Mo, Sr)
C. i. marinda de Jong & Treadaway, 1992 (Mq)
Coladenia ochracea de Jong & Treadaway, 1992 (Le, Mi, Py)
Coladenia semperi Elwes & Edwards, 1897 (Camiguin de Mi, Le)
Coladenia minor Chiba, Nakanishi, Fukuda & Yata, 1991 (Lz, Mq, Mo)
Coladenia similis de Jong & Treadaway, 1992 (Camiguin de Mi, Lz, Mq, Mi)
Coladenia palawana (Staudinger, 1889) (Pn)
genus: Gerosis
Gerosis limax (Plötz, 1884)
G. l. philippina Evans, 1932 (Bl, Pn)
Gerosis corona (Semper, 1892)
G. c. corona Semper, 1892 ( Alabat, Camiguin de Mi, Le, Lz, Me, Mi, Mo (excluding Mt. Halcon), Pnn, Sr)
G. c. halcona Treadaway & Nuyda, 1995 (northern Mo (Mt. Halcon))
genus: Tagiades
Tagiades japetus (Stoll, [1781])
T. j. titus (Plötz, 1884) (Bas, Biliran, Bl, Calamian, Camiguin de Lz, Camiguin de Mi, Catanduanes, Cu, Gu, Le, Lubang, Lz, Me, Mi, Mo, N, Pn, Py, Pl, Sr, So, Si, Sn, Twi)
Tagiades gana (Moore, 1865)
T. g. gana (Moore, 1865) (Pn, Si, Twi)
T. g. elegans (Mabille, 1877) (Bas, Biliran, Bl, Camiguin de Mi, Catanduanes, Dt, Le, Lz, Mq, Me, Mi, Mo, N, Pnn, Pl, Sr, So, Sn)
T. g. semperi Fruhstorfer, 1910 (Camiguin de Lz)
Tagiades parra Fruhstorfer, 1910
T. p. parra Fruhstorfer, 1910 (Pn)
Tagiades ultra Evans, 1932 (Pn)
Tagiades trebellius (Hopffer, 1874)
T. t. martinus (Plötz, 1884) (Babuyan, Bas, Bl, Cu, Camiguin de Mi, Dt, Hn, Le, Lz, Mq, Mi, Mo, Pn, Pl, Sr, Sn, Twi, Ticao)
genus: Mooreana
Mooreana princeps (Semper, 1892) (Le, Mi, Pnn, Sr)
Mooreana trichoneura (C. Felder & R. Felder, 1860)
M. t. trichoneuroides (Elwes & Edwards, 1897) (Pn)
genus: Odontoptilium
Odontoptilum angulatum (C. Felder, 1862)
O. a. helisa (Semper, 1892) (Bas, Bl, Cu, Le, Mi, Mo, N, Py, Sr)
O. a. sinka Evans, 1949 (Lz, Mq, Pl)
Odontoptilium pygela (Hewitson, 1868)
O. p. pygela (Hewitson, 1868) (Pn, Sng, Twi)
Odontoptilium leptogramma (Hewitson, 1868) (Cu, Le, Lz, Mi, Mo, Sr, Sn)
genus: Aeromachus
Aeromachus musca (Mabille, 1876) (Cu, Lz, Mo, Mi, N, So)
Aeromachus plumbeola (C. Felder & R. Felder, 1867) (Biliran, Le, Lz, Me, Mi, Mo, N, Py, Sr)
genus: Thoressa
Thoressa justini Inoue & Kawazoé, 1969
T. j. justini Inoue & Kawazoé, 1969 (northern Lz)
T. j. raphaeli Nuyda & Kitamura, 1994 (Le)
genus: Halpe
Halpe mahapara Fruhstorfer, 1911 (Calamian, Pn)
Halpe ormenes (Plötz, 1886)
H. o. vistula Evans, 1937 (Pn)
Halpe palawea (Staudinger, 1889) (Calamian, Pn)
Halpe luteisquama (Mabille, 1876) (Bas, Camiguin de Lz, Cu, Le, Lz, Mq, Mi, Mo, N, Pn, Py, Sr, Si, Sn, Twi)
Halpe latipinna de Jong & Treadaway, 1993 (Mo (Mt. Halcon))
Halpe dante Evans, 1949
H. d. dante Evans, 1949 (N)
H. d. luzona Evans, 1949 (Lz)
H. d. tilia Evans, 1949 (Le, Mi)
Halpe sulphurifera (Herrich-Schäffer, 1869) (Jl, Le, Lz, Mq, Me, Mi, Mo, N, Pn, Sn, Twi)
Halpe toxopea Evans, 1932 (Calamian, Pn)
Halpe pelethronix Fruhstorfer, 1910
H. p. pelethronix Fruhstorfer, 1910 (Pn)
Halpe inconspicua de Jong & Treadaway, 1993 (Le, Pnn, Sr)
Halpe purpurascens de Jong & Treadaway, 1993 (Le, Me, Mi, N, Py)
genus: Koruthaialos
Koruthaialos rubecula (Plötz, 1882)
K. r. atra Evans, 1949 (Cu, Le, Mi, N, Sr)
K. r. luzonensis Fruhstorfer, 1910 (Lz, Mq)
K. r. ponta Evans, 1949 (Calamian, Pn)
K. r. palawites Staudinger, 1889 (Calamian, Pn)
Koruthaialos sindu (C. Felder & R. Felder, 1860)
K. s. sindu (C. Felder & R. Felder, 1860) (Pn)
genus: Psolos
Psolos fuligo (Mabille, 1876)
P. s. fuligo (Mabille, 1876) (Bl, Bas, Bl, Cu, Camiguin de Mi, Catanduanes, Jl, Le, Lz, Me, Mi, Mo, N, Pn, Py, Sr, Si, Sn, Twi)
genus: Ancistroides
Ancistroides nigrita (Latreille, [1824])
A. n. fumatus (Mabille, 1876) (Babuyan, Bl, Bas, Biliran, Bl, Camiguin de Mi, Cu, Gu, Le, Lz, Me, Mi, Mo, N, Pn, Py, Sr, Sn)
genus: Notocrypta
Notocrypta paralysos (Wood-Mason & de Nicéville, 1881)
N. p. chunda Fruhstorfer, 1911 (Bl, Calamian, Pn)
N. p. varians (Plötz, 1884) (Si)
N. p. volux (Mabille, 1883) (Bas, Biliran, Cu, Dt, Hn, Le, Lz, Mq, Me, Mi, Mo, N, Py, Pl, Sr, Sn, Twi group excluding Si)
Notocrypta clavata (Staudinger, 1889)
N. c. clavata (Staudinger, 1889) (Pn)
Notocrypta howarthi Hayashi, 1980 (Mi)
Notocrypta feisthamelii (Boisduval, 1832)
N. f. alinkara Fruhstorfer, 1911 (Babuyan, Calamian, Cu, Le, Lz, Mq, Mi, Mo, N, Pn, Pnn, Py, Pl, Sr, Sn)
genus: Suada
Suada catoleucos (Staudinger, 1889) (Mi, Pn)
Suada albina (Semper, 1892) (Bas, Le, Lz, Mi, Pl)
genus: Suastus
Suastus minutus (Moore, 1877)
S. m. scopas (Staudinger, 1889) (Pn)
S. m. compactus de Jong & Treadaway, 1993 (Calamian)
Suastus migreus Semper, 1892 (Babuyan, Cu, Hn, Lz, Mq, Mi, Mo, Sn, Twi)
genus: Cupitha
Cupitha pureea (Moore, 1877) (Bl, Pn)
genus: Zographetus
Zographetus pallens de Jong & Treadaway, 1993 (Camiguin de Lz, Mq)
Zographetus ogygia (Hewitson, [1866])
Z. o. durga (Plötz, 1884) (Camiguin de Mi, Le, Lz, Mq, Mi, Mo, N, Pn, Py, Pl, Sr)
Z. o. ogygioides (Elwes & Edwards, 1897) (Me, Py, Sn, Twi)
Zographetus doxus Eliot, 1959 (Pn)
Zographetus abima (Hewitson, 1877) (Pn)
Zographetus rama (Mabille, 1876) (Le, Mo, Sr)
genus: Oerane
Oerane microthyrus (Mabille, 1883)
O. m. microthyrus (Mabille, 1883) (Le, Lz, Mq, Mi, Mo, Sr)
genus: Hyarotis
Hyarotis adrastus (Stoll, [1780])
H. a. praba (Moore, 1866) (Calamian, Mi, Pn)
Hyarotis microsticta (Wood-Mason & de Nicéville, 1887)
H. m. microsticta (Wood-Mason & de Nicéville, 1887) (Lz, Mo)
Hyarotis iadera de Nicéville, 1895 (Pn)
genus: Quedara
Quedara monteithi (Wood-Mason & de Nicéville, 1887)
Q. m. monteithi (Wood-Mason & de Nicéville, 1887) (Bl)
Q. m. noctis (Staudinger, 1889) (Calamian, Le, Mi, Pn, Sr)
genus: Isma
Isma bipunctata (Elwes & Edwards, 1897) (Mi, Pn)
Isma binotatus (Elwes & Edwards, 1897) (Mi)
Isma feralia (Hewitson, [1868]) (Le, Mi, Sr)
genus: Pyroneura
Pyroneura flavia (Staudinger, 1889)
P. f. flavia (Staudinger, 1889) (Pn)
Pyroneura agnesia (Eliot, 1967)
P. a. limbanga Eliot, 1967 (Pn)
Pyroneura liburnia (Hewitson, 1868)
P. l. liburnia (Hewitson, 1868) (Lz, Mq, Pl)
P. l. divinae Schröder & Treadaway, 1987 (Py, Romblon, Sn)
P. l. dora de Jong & Treadaway, 1993 (Mo)
P. l. minda (Evans, 1941) (Hn, Le, Mi)
P. l. rosa de Jong & Treadaway, 1993 (N)
P. l. wita de Jong & Treadaway, 1993 (Twi)
Pyroneura derna (Evans, 1941) (Pn)
Pyroneura niasana (Fruhstorfer, 1909)
P. n. burmana (Evans, 1926) (Pn)
Pyroneura toshikoae Hayashi, 1980 (eastern Mi)
genus: Plastingia
Plastingia naga (de Nicéville, 1884) (Bl, Camiguin de Lz, Le, Lz, Mq, Mi, Mo, Pn, Pnn)
Plastingia pellonia Fruhstorfer, 1909 (Pn)
Plastingia viburnia (Semper, 1892) (Lz, Mi, Mo, N, Pn, Sr)
genus: Salanoemia
Salanoemia sala (Hewitson, 1866) (Pn)
Salanoemia similis (Elwes & Edwards, 1897) (Du, Pn)
genus: Xanthoneura
Xanthoneura telesinus (Mabille, 1878) (Bl, Le, Lz, Mi, Mo, N, Sr)
genus: Lotongus
Lotongus calathus (Hewitson, 1876)
L. c. calathus (Hewitson, 1876) (Pn)
L. c. shigeo Treadaway & Nuyda, 1994 (Bas)
genus: Zela
Zela excellens (Staudinger, 1889) (Pn)
Zela zeus de Nicéville, [1895]
Z. z. zeus de Nicéville, [1895] (Twi)
Z. z. major Evans, 1932 (Hn, Le, Lz, Mi, Mo, Sr, Sn)
Zela zenon de Nicéville, [1895] (Pn)
genus: Gangara
Gangara thyrsis (Fabricius, 1775)
G. t. thyrsis (Fabricius, 1775) (Pn)
G. t. philippensis Fruhstorfer, 1910 (Camiguin de Lz, Le, Lz, Mi, Mo, Pnn, Sr, Sn)
G. t. magnificens de Jong & Treadaway, 1993 (N, Mt. Canlaon)
Gangara lebadea (Hewitson, [1868])
G. l. lebadea (Hewitson, [1868]) (Pn)
G. l. janlourensi Schröder & Treadaway, 1987 (Le)
G. l. ustina Treadaway & Nuyda, 1995 (Pn)
genus: Erionota
Erionota thrax (Linnaeus, 1767)
E. t. thrax (Linnaeus, 1767) (Cu, Catanduanes, Lz (excluding northern & north-western), Mq, Me, Mo, N, Pn, Py, Pl, Si, Sn, Twi)
E. t. alexandra Semper, 1892 (northern & north-western Lz)
E. t. mindana Evans, 1941 (Dt, Hn, Jl, Le, Mi, Sr)
Erionota hiraca (Moore, 1881)
E. h. apex Semper, 1892 (Le, Lz, Mi, Mo, Pn, Pl, Sr, Ticao)
Erionota surprisa de Jong & Treadaway, 1992 (Babuyan, Cu, Le, Lz, Mq, Mi, Mo, N, Pn, Py, Pl, Sr, Twi, Ticao)
Erionota sybirita (Hewitson, 1876) (Pn)
Erionota torus Evans, 1941 (Cu, Dt, Le, Mi, N, Py, Sr)
genus: Matapa
Matapa aria (Moore, 1866) (Calamian, Catanduanes, Hn, Le, Lz, Mi, Mo, N, Pn, Py, Sn)
Matapa intermedia de Jong, 1983
M. i. nigrita de Jong, 1983 (Sr)
Matapa celsina (C. Felder & R. Felder, 1867) (eastern Mi)
genus: Unkana
Unkana ambasa (Moore, [1858])
U. a. ambasa (Moore, [1858]) (Pn)
U. a. batara Distant, 1886 (Si, Twi)
U. a. mindanaensis Fruhstorfer, 1911 (Bl, Camiguin de Lz, Dt, Hn, Le, Lz, Mi, Mo, N, Py, Sr, Sn)
genus: Hidari
Hidari irava (Moore, [1858]) (Mi, Sulu Archipelago)
genus: Acerbas
Acerbas anthea (Hewitson, 1868)
A. a. anthea (Hewitson, 1868) (Le, Mi, Pnn)
A. a. luzona de Jong, 1982 (Lz)
Acerbas duris (Mabille, 1883)
A. d. duris (Mabille, 1883) (Camiguin de Lz, Camiguin de Mi, Le, Lz, Mi, Mo, N)
genus: Pirdana
Pirdana hyela (Hewitson, 1867)
P. h. hyela Hewitson, 1867 (Lz, Pn)
Pirdana fusca de Jong & Treadaway, 1993 (Mi, Sr)
genus: Taractrocera
Taractrocera luzonensis (Staudinger, 1889)
T. l. luzonensis (Staudinger, 1889) (Bl, Bas, Cu, Dt, Le, Lz, Mq, Me, Mi, Mo, N, Pn, Py, Sr, Sn)
T. l. stella Evans, 1934 (Si, Twi)
genus: Oriens
Oriens paragola (de Nicéville, 1896) (Pn)
Oriens gola (Moore, 1877)
O. g. pseudolus (Mabille, 1883) (Bl, Calamian, Lz, Pn)
Oriens californica (Scudder, 1872) (Bl, Hn, Jl, Le, Lz, Me, Mi, Mo, Py, Pl, Sr, Sn, Twi)
Oriens fons Evans, 1949 (Bas, Lz, Mi, Mo, Py, Sr)
genus: Potanthus
Potanthus omaha (W. H. Edwards, 1863)
P. o. bione Evans, 1949 (Mi)
P. o. maesina (Evans, 1934) (Twi)
Potanthus fettingi (Moschler, 1878)
P. f. alpha (Evans, 1934) (Lz)
Potanthus niobe (Evans, 1934)
P. n. niobe (Evans, 1934) (Dt, Mi, N, Sn)
P. n. hyuga de Jong & Treadaway, 1993 (northern Lz, northern Mo)
Potanthus confucius (C. Felder & R. Felder, 1862)
P. c. yojana (Fruhstorfer, 1911) (Pn)
Potanthus mingo (W. H. Edwards, 1866)
P. m. mingo (W. H. Edwards, 1866) (Bas, Jl, Le, Lz, Me, Mi, Mo, N, Py, Sr, Sng, Twi)
Potanthus pava (Fruhstorfer, 1911)
P. p. lesbia Evans, 1934 (Dt, Lz, Mi, Mo, Pl, Sn)
Potanthus ganda (Fruhstorfer, 1911)
P. g. marla Evans, 1949 (Calamian, Pn)
Potanthus hetaerus (Mabille, 1883)
P. h. hetaerus (Mabille, 1883) (Bng, Hn, Le, Lz, Mi, Mo, N, Py, Pl, Romblon, Sn, Twi)
Potanthus serina (Plötz, 1883) (Bl, Calamian, Pn, Si, Twi)
genus: Telicota
Telicota colon (Fabricius, 1775)
T. c. vaja Corbet, 1942 (Bl, Lz, Mq, Me, Mi, Mo, N, Pn, Sn)
Telicota augias (Linnaeus, 1763)
T. a. augias (Linnaeus, 1763) (Pn)
T. a. pythias (Mabille, 1878) (Bl, Camiguin de Mi, Catanduanes, Cu, Gu, Le, Lz, Mq, Mi, Mo, N, Py, Sr, Sn, Twi)
Telicota ancilla (Herrich-Schäffer, 1869)
T. a. minda Evans, 1934 (Bas, Hn, Le, Lz, Me, Mi, Mo, N, Romblon, Sr, Ticao)
T. a. santa Evans, 1934 (Pn)
Telicota ohara (Plötz, 1883)
T. o. jania Evans, 1949 (Bl, Bas, Hn, Le, Mq, Me, Mi, Mo, N, Pn, Pl, Sr, Sn)
Telicota hilda Eliot, 1959
T. h. palawana Murayama & Uehara, 1992 (Pn)
genus: Cephrenes
Cephrenes acalle (Hopffer, 1874)
C. a. kliana Evans, 1934 (Bl, Pn, Si)
C. a. chrysozona (Plötz, 1883) (Bl, Cu, Camiguin de Mi, Catanduanes, Le, Lz, Mq, Mi, Mo, N, Py, Pl, Sr, Sn)
genus: Prusiana
Prusiana prusias (C. Felder, 1861)
P. p. matinus (Fruhstorfer, 1911) (Bas, Bl, Cu, Camiguin de Lz, Camiguin de Mi, Catanduanes, Gu, Hn, Le, Lz, Mq, Mi, Mo, N, Pn, Py, Pl, Sn, Twi)
genus: Parnara
Parnara bada (Moore, 1878)
P. b. borneana Chiba & Eliot, 1991 (Camiguin de Lz, Hn, Le, Lz, Me, Mo, Mi, Pn, Romblon, Sn, Twi)
P. b. bada (Moore, 1878) (Lz, Me, Mi, Romblon, Pn, Sn)
Parnara kawazoei Chiba & Eliot, 1991 (Hn, Le, Lz, Mi, Mo, N, Py, Sr, Sn)
genus: Borbo
Borbo cinnara (Wallace, 1866) (Bl, Camiguin de Mi, Jl, Le, Lubang, Lz, Me, Mi, Mo, N, Pn, Py, Sr, Sng, Si, Twi)
genus: Pelopidas
Pelopidas agna (Moore, 1866)
P. a. agna (Moore, 1866) (Bl, Bas, Cu, Camiguin de Lz, Hn, Jl, Le, Lz, Me, Mi, Mo, N, Pn, Pnn, Sr, Si, Sn, Twi, Ticao)
Pelopidas mathias (Fabricius, 1798)
P. m. mathias (Fabricius, 1798) (Bl, Camiguin de Lz, Camiguin de Mi, Catanduanes, Cu, Gu, Hn, Jl, Le, Lz, Mq, Me, Mo, N, Pn, Pnn, Py, Sr, Twi)
Pelopidas conjuncta (Herrich-Schäffer, 1869)
P. c. conjuncta (Herrich-Schäffer, 1869) (Bas, Bl, Cu, Camiguin de Lz, Catanduanes, Dt, Hn, Le, Lz, Mq, Me, Mi, Mindor, N, Pn, Py, Pnn, Sr, Si, Sn, Twi)
genus: Polytremis
Polytremis lubricans (Herrich-Schäffer, 1869)
P. l. lubricans (Herrich-Schäffer, 1869) (Si, Twi)
genus: Baoris
Baoris oceia (Hewitson, 1868) (Babuyan, Bl, Bas, Biliran, Bl, Calamian, Camiguin de Mi, Catanduanes, Hn, Jl, Le, Lz, Mq, Mi, Mo, N, Pn, Pnn, Py, Sr, Si, Sn, Twi, Ticao)
genus: Caltoris
Caltoris brunnea (Snellen, 1876)
C. b. caere de Nicéville, 1891 (Calamian, Pn)
Caltoris bromus Leech, 1893
C. b. bromus Leech, 1893 (Le, Me, Mi, Pn, Py, Sr)
Caltoris cormasa (Hewitson, 1876) (Hn, Le, Lz, Marindfuque, Mi, Mo, Pn, Sr, Si, Sn, Twi)
Caltoris philippina (Herrich-Schäffer, 1869)
C. p. philippina (Herrich-Schäffer, 1869) (Bl, Bas, Camiguin de Mi, Cu, Le, Lz, Mi, Mo, N, Pn, Py, Si, Twi)

References
Sources
Bernard D'Abrera Butterflies of the Oriental Region. Part 1 (1981) Papilionidae, Pieridae, Danaidae Part 2 (1983) Nymphalidae, Satyridae, Amathusidae  Part 3 (1986) Lycaenidae, Riodinidae  Hill House Publishers Lansdowne Editions. 
Danielsen, F. & Treadaway, C.G., 2004. Priority conservation areas for butterflies (Lepidoptera: Rhopalocera) in the Philippine islands. Animal Conservation. 7: 79 – 92
Evans, W.H., 1949 A catalogue of the Hesperiidae from Europe, Asia and Australia in the British Museum A Catalogue of the Hesperiidae from Europe, Asia, and Australia in the British Museum (Natural History) .: 1–502, pl. 1-53
Eliot, J.N., 1992. The Butterflies of the Malay Peninsula. Corbet & Pendlebury. 4th ed. Malayan Nature Society, 1992
Fleming, W. A., 1975 Butterflies of West Malaysia & Singapore Berkshire, Eng.: Classey Publications Two volumes  (volume 1)
Fruhstorfer, H., 1910 The Indo-Australian Rhopalocera. [Danaidae] in Seitz, A. (ed.). The Macrolepidoptera of the World: A Systematic Description of the Hitherto Known Macrolepidoptera. Stuttgart: Alfred Kernen Vol. 9 1197 pp.
Fruhstorfer, H., 1911. Appendix to Danaidae in Seitz, A. (ed.). The Macrolepidoptera of the World. 9. The Indo-Australian Rhopalocera. 2 vols. Stuttgart: Alfred Kernen Verlag viii+1197 pp.
Fruhstorfer, H., 1911. The Indo-Australian Rhopalocera. [Amathusiidae]. pp. 403–448 in Seitz, A. (ed.). The Macrolepidoptera of the World: A Systematic Description of the Hitherto Known Macrolepidoptera. Stuttgart: Alfred Kernen Vol. 9 1197 pp.
Fruhstorfer, H., 1911. The Indo-Australian Rhopalocera. [Satyridae]. 285-401 pls 87–99 in Seitz, A. (ed.). The Macrolepidoptera of the World: A Systematic Description of the Hitherto Known Macrolepidoptera. Stuttgart: Alfred Kernen Vol. 9 1197 pp. 
Fruhstorfer, H., 1912. The Indo-Australian Rhopalocera. [Nymphalidae]. 453–536, 545-560 pls 115, 119, 123–138 in Seitz, A. (ed.). The Macrolepidoptera of the World: A Systematic Description of the Hitherto Known Macrolepidoptera. Stuttgart: Alfred Kernen Vol. 9 1197 pp.
 Fruhstorfer H., 1910 The Indo-Australian Rhopalocera. [Pieridae] in Seitz, A. (ed.). The Macrolepidoptera of the World: A Systematic Description of the Hitherto Known Macrolepidoptera. Stuttgart: Alfred Kernen Vol. 9 1197 pp.
Fruhstorfer H., 1915-1924 The Indo-Australian Rhopalocera [Lycaenidae (pars)] in Seitz, A. (ed.). The Macrolepidoptera of the World: A Systematic Description of the Hitherto Known Macrolepidoptera. Stuttgart: Alfred Kernen Vol. 9 1197 pp.
De Jong, Rienke & Treadaway, Colin G., 2008 Hesperiidae 1, Hesperiidae of the Philippine Islands. Butterflies of the world. 29: 1–15. pls. 1-39.
Jordan, K., 1908-1909 The Indo-Australian Rhopalocera [Papilionidae] in Seitz, A. (ed.). The Macrolepidoptera of the World: A Systematic Description of the Hitherto Known Macrolepidoptera. Stuttgart: Alfred Kernen Vol. 9 1197 pp.
Seitz, A., 1924-1927 The Indo-Australian Rhopalocera [Lycaenidae (pars)] in Seitz, A. (ed.). The Macrolepidoptera of the World: A Systematic Description of the Hitherto Known Macrolepidoptera. Stuttgart: Alfred Kernen Vol. 9 1197 pp.
Staudinger, 1889 Lepidoptera der Insel Palawan Dt. ent. Z. Iris 2 (1): 3–180, pl. 1-2 
Treadaway, C.G., 1995: Checklist of the butterflies of the Philippine Islands (Lepidoptera: Rhopalocera). In Nässig, W.A. and Settele, J. (eds.) Beiträge zur Kenntnis der Lepidoptera der Philippinen, II. Contributions to the knowledge of the Lepidoptera of the Philippines. Frankfurt: NEVA, supplement 14.
Treadaway, Colin G. & Schrőder, Heintz G., 2012: Revised checklist of the butterflies of the Philippine Islands (Lepidoptera: Rhopalocera). Nachrichten des Entomologischen Vereins Apollo, Suppl. 20: 1-64.
Schroeder & Treadaway (1999). Zur Kenntnis philippinischer Lycaenidae 12. Ent. Z., 109(5): 206–212.
Schröder & Treadaway, 1980 Neue Lepidoptera von den Philippinen Ent. Z. Frankf. a. M. 90 (21): 233-243
Georg Semper, 1888 Die Schmetterlinge der Philippinischen Inseln. Reisen im Archipel der Philippinen Reisen Philipp. (1): 1-46, pl. 1–8, A (1886), (2): 47–86, pl. 9-16 (1887), (3): 87–134, pl. 17-24 (1888), (4): 135–174, pl. 25-32 (1889), (5): 175–238, pl. 33–38, B (1890), (6): 239–270, pl. 39-46 (1891), (7): 271–380, pl. 47-49 [iv] (1892) plates online here
Casto de Elera, R. P., 1895. Catalogo Sistematico de toda la Fauna de Filipinas. Vol 2, Articulados. Manila, Impresta de la Colegiode Santo Tomas.
Felder, C. and Felder, R., 1862. Lepidoptera nova a Dre. Carolo Semper in insulis Philippinis collecta, Series secunda. Wien ent. Monats. 6(9): 282–294.
Suguru, Igarashi and Fukuda Haruo 1997 The Life Histories of Asian Butterflies Tokyo: Tokai University Press. 2 volumes  

Wikispecies taxonomy additional references via species or by author. Key papers are by: Heinz G. Schroeder, Hisakazu Hayashi, Colin Treadaway, Justin Nuyda, Siuiti Murayama, Hachiro Okamura, Shilo Osada, Satoshi Hashimoto, Yusuke Takanami, Yasuo Seki, Akito Kawazoe, John Nevill Eliot, Stefan Schröder, Julian Jumalon, papers in Tyô-to-Ga Series website (open access), Insect Society of the Philippines Fil-Kulisap, Nachrichten des Entomologischen Vereins Apollo

Citations

Lists of butterflies by location
Butterflies by country